

287001–287100 

|-bgcolor=#fefefe
| 287001 ||  || — || August 18, 2002 || Palomar || NEAT || NYS || align=right data-sort-value="0.67" | 670 m || 
|-id=002 bgcolor=#d6d6d6
| 287002 ||  || — || August 18, 2002 || Palomar || NEAT || K-2 || align=right | 1.5 km || 
|-id=003 bgcolor=#E9E9E9
| 287003 ||  || — || August 30, 2002 || Palomar || NEAT || XIZ || align=right | 1.8 km || 
|-id=004 bgcolor=#E9E9E9
| 287004 ||  || — || August 27, 2002 || Palomar || NEAT || — || align=right | 2.5 km || 
|-id=005 bgcolor=#d6d6d6
| 287005 ||  || — || August 28, 2002 || Palomar || NEAT || — || align=right | 3.1 km || 
|-id=006 bgcolor=#E9E9E9
| 287006 ||  || — || August 18, 2002 || Palomar || NEAT || — || align=right | 2.3 km || 
|-id=007 bgcolor=#d6d6d6
| 287007 ||  || — || August 30, 2002 || Palomar || NEAT || — || align=right | 3.8 km || 
|-id=008 bgcolor=#d6d6d6
| 287008 ||  || — || August 29, 2002 || Palomar || NEAT || — || align=right | 3.3 km || 
|-id=009 bgcolor=#E9E9E9
| 287009 ||  || — || August 30, 2002 || Palomar || NEAT || — || align=right | 2.1 km || 
|-id=010 bgcolor=#fefefe
| 287010 ||  || — || August 18, 2002 || Palomar || NEAT || FLO || align=right data-sort-value="0.77" | 770 m || 
|-id=011 bgcolor=#fefefe
| 287011 ||  || — || August 17, 2002 || Palomar || NEAT || — || align=right | 1.3 km || 
|-id=012 bgcolor=#E9E9E9
| 287012 ||  || — || August 27, 2002 || Palomar || NEAT || — || align=right | 2.2 km || 
|-id=013 bgcolor=#d6d6d6
| 287013 ||  || — || August 16, 2002 || Palomar || NEAT || — || align=right | 3.0 km || 
|-id=014 bgcolor=#E9E9E9
| 287014 ||  || — || August 16, 2002 || Palomar || NEAT || — || align=right | 1.6 km || 
|-id=015 bgcolor=#E9E9E9
| 287015 ||  || — || August 16, 2002 || Palomar || NEAT || — || align=right | 1.8 km || 
|-id=016 bgcolor=#E9E9E9
| 287016 ||  || — || August 17, 2002 || Palomar || NEAT || — || align=right | 1.8 km || 
|-id=017 bgcolor=#E9E9E9
| 287017 ||  || — || August 17, 2002 || Palomar || NEAT || — || align=right | 1.8 km || 
|-id=018 bgcolor=#d6d6d6
| 287018 ||  || — || August 17, 2002 || Palomar || NEAT || — || align=right | 3.5 km || 
|-id=019 bgcolor=#E9E9E9
| 287019 ||  || — || August 30, 2002 || Palomar || NEAT || — || align=right | 1.0 km || 
|-id=020 bgcolor=#d6d6d6
| 287020 ||  || — || August 29, 2002 || Palomar || NEAT || — || align=right | 3.3 km || 
|-id=021 bgcolor=#E9E9E9
| 287021 ||  || — || August 29, 2002 || Palomar || NEAT || — || align=right | 2.1 km || 
|-id=022 bgcolor=#d6d6d6
| 287022 ||  || — || August 27, 2002 || Palomar || NEAT || KAR || align=right | 1.1 km || 
|-id=023 bgcolor=#E9E9E9
| 287023 ||  || — || August 24, 2002 || Palomar || NEAT || — || align=right | 2.0 km || 
|-id=024 bgcolor=#d6d6d6
| 287024 ||  || — || August 17, 2002 || Palomar || NEAT || EOS || align=right | 2.1 km || 
|-id=025 bgcolor=#fefefe
| 287025 ||  || — || August 21, 2002 || Palomar || NEAT || — || align=right data-sort-value="0.93" | 930 m || 
|-id=026 bgcolor=#fefefe
| 287026 ||  || — || August 19, 2002 || Palomar || NEAT || V || align=right data-sort-value="0.65" | 650 m || 
|-id=027 bgcolor=#d6d6d6
| 287027 ||  || — || August 25, 2002 || Palomar || NEAT || — || align=right | 6.7 km || 
|-id=028 bgcolor=#E9E9E9
| 287028 ||  || — || August 18, 2002 || Palomar || NEAT || — || align=right | 2.3 km || 
|-id=029 bgcolor=#E9E9E9
| 287029 ||  || — || August 30, 2002 || Palomar || NEAT || — || align=right | 2.5 km || 
|-id=030 bgcolor=#d6d6d6
| 287030 ||  || — || August 18, 2002 || Palomar || NEAT || — || align=right | 4.1 km || 
|-id=031 bgcolor=#E9E9E9
| 287031 ||  || — || August 26, 2002 || Palomar || NEAT || — || align=right | 2.9 km || 
|-id=032 bgcolor=#fefefe
| 287032 ||  || — || August 27, 2002 || Palomar || NEAT || FLO || align=right data-sort-value="0.75" | 750 m || 
|-id=033 bgcolor=#d6d6d6
| 287033 ||  || — || August 17, 2002 || Palomar || NEAT || — || align=right | 3.0 km || 
|-id=034 bgcolor=#E9E9E9
| 287034 ||  || — || August 16, 2002 || Palomar || NEAT || — || align=right | 2.7 km || 
|-id=035 bgcolor=#d6d6d6
| 287035 ||  || — || August 17, 2002 || Palomar || NEAT || CHA || align=right | 2.6 km || 
|-id=036 bgcolor=#E9E9E9
| 287036 ||  || — || August 17, 2002 || Palomar || NEAT || HEN || align=right | 1.0 km || 
|-id=037 bgcolor=#E9E9E9
| 287037 ||  || — || August 27, 2002 || Palomar || NEAT || — || align=right | 1.0 km || 
|-id=038 bgcolor=#d6d6d6
| 287038 ||  || — || August 27, 2002 || Palomar || NEAT || — || align=right | 3.7 km || 
|-id=039 bgcolor=#E9E9E9
| 287039 ||  || — || August 18, 2002 || Palomar || NEAT || HEN || align=right | 1.3 km || 
|-id=040 bgcolor=#E9E9E9
| 287040 ||  || — || August 18, 2002 || Palomar || NEAT || — || align=right | 1.6 km || 
|-id=041 bgcolor=#E9E9E9
| 287041 ||  || — || August 29, 2002 || Palomar || NEAT || — || align=right | 2.4 km || 
|-id=042 bgcolor=#d6d6d6
| 287042 ||  || — || August 18, 2002 || Palomar || NEAT || — || align=right | 3.2 km || 
|-id=043 bgcolor=#d6d6d6
| 287043 ||  || — || August 18, 2002 || Palomar || NEAT || — || align=right | 2.7 km || 
|-id=044 bgcolor=#d6d6d6
| 287044 ||  || — || August 17, 2002 || Palomar || NEAT || LUT || align=right | 6.1 km || 
|-id=045 bgcolor=#d6d6d6
| 287045 ||  || — || August 27, 2002 || Palomar || NEAT || — || align=right | 5.9 km || 
|-id=046 bgcolor=#d6d6d6
| 287046 ||  || — || August 16, 2002 || Palomar || NEAT || EOS || align=right | 4.5 km || 
|-id=047 bgcolor=#d6d6d6
| 287047 ||  || — || August 18, 2002 || Palomar || NEAT || SYL7:4 || align=right | 5.2 km || 
|-id=048 bgcolor=#E9E9E9
| 287048 ||  || — || August 28, 2002 || Palomar || NEAT || WIT || align=right | 1.1 km || 
|-id=049 bgcolor=#E9E9E9
| 287049 ||  || — || August 29, 2002 || Palomar || NEAT || HEN || align=right | 1.4 km || 
|-id=050 bgcolor=#E9E9E9
| 287050 ||  || — || August 29, 2002 || Palomar || NEAT || — || align=right | 1.9 km || 
|-id=051 bgcolor=#E9E9E9
| 287051 ||  || — || August 28, 2002 || Palomar || NEAT || WIT || align=right | 1.1 km || 
|-id=052 bgcolor=#d6d6d6
| 287052 ||  || — || August 30, 2002 || Palomar || NEAT || — || align=right | 2.6 km || 
|-id=053 bgcolor=#E9E9E9
| 287053 ||  || — || August 30, 2002 || Palomar || NEAT || — || align=right | 1.8 km || 
|-id=054 bgcolor=#d6d6d6
| 287054 ||  || — || August 28, 2002 || Palomar || NEAT || EMA || align=right | 4.5 km || 
|-id=055 bgcolor=#d6d6d6
| 287055 ||  || — || August 30, 2002 || Palomar || NEAT || — || align=right | 2.9 km || 
|-id=056 bgcolor=#E9E9E9
| 287056 ||  || — || August 30, 2002 || Palomar || NEAT || NEM || align=right | 2.6 km || 
|-id=057 bgcolor=#E9E9E9
| 287057 || 2002 RG || — || September 1, 2002 || Kvistaberg || UDAS || — || align=right | 2.5 km || 
|-id=058 bgcolor=#E9E9E9
| 287058 ||  || — || September 1, 2002 || Kvistaberg || UDAS || — || align=right | 2.1 km || 
|-id=059 bgcolor=#E9E9E9
| 287059 ||  || — || September 4, 2002 || Emerald Lane || L. Ball || — || align=right | 2.8 km || 
|-id=060 bgcolor=#fefefe
| 287060 ||  || — || September 3, 2002 || Palomar || NEAT || — || align=right | 1.0 km || 
|-id=061 bgcolor=#E9E9E9
| 287061 ||  || — || September 3, 2002 || Palomar || NEAT || EUN || align=right | 1.5 km || 
|-id=062 bgcolor=#E9E9E9
| 287062 ||  || — || September 4, 2002 || Palomar || NEAT || — || align=right | 3.0 km || 
|-id=063 bgcolor=#E9E9E9
| 287063 ||  || — || September 4, 2002 || Anderson Mesa || LONEOS || — || align=right | 1.8 km || 
|-id=064 bgcolor=#E9E9E9
| 287064 ||  || — || September 4, 2002 || Anderson Mesa || LONEOS || — || align=right | 3.4 km || 
|-id=065 bgcolor=#fefefe
| 287065 ||  || — || September 4, 2002 || Anderson Mesa || LONEOS || — || align=right | 1.2 km || 
|-id=066 bgcolor=#fefefe
| 287066 ||  || — || September 4, 2002 || Anderson Mesa || LONEOS || V || align=right | 1.1 km || 
|-id=067 bgcolor=#fefefe
| 287067 ||  || — || September 4, 2002 || Anderson Mesa || LONEOS || NYS || align=right | 1.00 km || 
|-id=068 bgcolor=#E9E9E9
| 287068 ||  || — || September 4, 2002 || Anderson Mesa || LONEOS || — || align=right | 2.8 km || 
|-id=069 bgcolor=#fefefe
| 287069 ||  || — || September 4, 2002 || Anderson Mesa || LONEOS || — || align=right data-sort-value="0.85" | 850 m || 
|-id=070 bgcolor=#fefefe
| 287070 ||  || — || September 4, 2002 || Anderson Mesa || LONEOS || — || align=right data-sort-value="0.92" | 920 m || 
|-id=071 bgcolor=#E9E9E9
| 287071 ||  || — || September 3, 2002 || Palomar || NEAT || EUN || align=right | 1.9 km || 
|-id=072 bgcolor=#E9E9E9
| 287072 ||  || — || September 3, 2002 || Haleakala || NEAT || MRX || align=right | 1.6 km || 
|-id=073 bgcolor=#fefefe
| 287073 ||  || — || September 4, 2002 || Anderson Mesa || LONEOS || NYS || align=right data-sort-value="0.69" | 690 m || 
|-id=074 bgcolor=#fefefe
| 287074 ||  || — || September 4, 2002 || Anderson Mesa || LONEOS || — || align=right data-sort-value="0.70" | 700 m || 
|-id=075 bgcolor=#fefefe
| 287075 ||  || — || September 5, 2002 || Anderson Mesa || LONEOS || SVE || align=right | 2.5 km || 
|-id=076 bgcolor=#E9E9E9
| 287076 ||  || — || September 5, 2002 || Anderson Mesa || LONEOS || AEO || align=right | 1.3 km || 
|-id=077 bgcolor=#E9E9E9
| 287077 ||  || — || September 5, 2002 || Anderson Mesa || LONEOS || — || align=right | 2.9 km || 
|-id=078 bgcolor=#E9E9E9
| 287078 ||  || — || September 5, 2002 || Anderson Mesa || LONEOS || — || align=right | 3.2 km || 
|-id=079 bgcolor=#fefefe
| 287079 ||  || — || September 5, 2002 || Anderson Mesa || LONEOS || — || align=right | 1.3 km || 
|-id=080 bgcolor=#fefefe
| 287080 ||  || — || September 5, 2002 || Socorro || LINEAR || NYS || align=right data-sort-value="0.92" | 920 m || 
|-id=081 bgcolor=#E9E9E9
| 287081 ||  || — || September 5, 2002 || Socorro || LINEAR || — || align=right | 5.4 km || 
|-id=082 bgcolor=#E9E9E9
| 287082 ||  || — || September 5, 2002 || Anderson Mesa || LONEOS || — || align=right | 4.0 km || 
|-id=083 bgcolor=#E9E9E9
| 287083 ||  || — || September 5, 2002 || Anderson Mesa || LONEOS || — || align=right | 2.0 km || 
|-id=084 bgcolor=#E9E9E9
| 287084 ||  || — || September 5, 2002 || Anderson Mesa || LONEOS || — || align=right | 1.3 km || 
|-id=085 bgcolor=#fefefe
| 287085 ||  || — || September 4, 2002 || Anderson Mesa || LONEOS || ERI || align=right | 2.0 km || 
|-id=086 bgcolor=#fefefe
| 287086 ||  || — || September 4, 2002 || Anderson Mesa || LONEOS || NYS || align=right data-sort-value="0.80" | 800 m || 
|-id=087 bgcolor=#E9E9E9
| 287087 ||  || — || September 5, 2002 || Socorro || LINEAR || — || align=right | 2.2 km || 
|-id=088 bgcolor=#E9E9E9
| 287088 ||  || — || September 5, 2002 || Socorro || LINEAR || — || align=right | 1.2 km || 
|-id=089 bgcolor=#E9E9E9
| 287089 ||  || — || September 5, 2002 || Socorro || LINEAR || — || align=right | 3.4 km || 
|-id=090 bgcolor=#E9E9E9
| 287090 ||  || — || September 5, 2002 || Socorro || LINEAR || — || align=right data-sort-value="0.86" | 860 m || 
|-id=091 bgcolor=#E9E9E9
| 287091 ||  || — || September 5, 2002 || Socorro || LINEAR || NEM || align=right | 3.3 km || 
|-id=092 bgcolor=#E9E9E9
| 287092 ||  || — || September 5, 2002 || Socorro || LINEAR || GAL || align=right | 2.4 km || 
|-id=093 bgcolor=#E9E9E9
| 287093 ||  || — || September 5, 2002 || Socorro || LINEAR || — || align=right | 2.8 km || 
|-id=094 bgcolor=#E9E9E9
| 287094 ||  || — || September 5, 2002 || Socorro || LINEAR || — || align=right | 1.4 km || 
|-id=095 bgcolor=#E9E9E9
| 287095 ||  || — || September 6, 2002 || Socorro || LINEAR || — || align=right | 2.0 km || 
|-id=096 bgcolor=#fefefe
| 287096 ||  || — || September 6, 2002 || Socorro || LINEAR || V || align=right data-sort-value="0.82" | 820 m || 
|-id=097 bgcolor=#fefefe
| 287097 ||  || — || September 5, 2002 || Anderson Mesa || LONEOS || — || align=right data-sort-value="0.86" | 860 m || 
|-id=098 bgcolor=#E9E9E9
| 287098 ||  || — || September 9, 2002 || Palomar || NEAT || JUN || align=right | 1.3 km || 
|-id=099 bgcolor=#E9E9E9
| 287099 ||  || — || September 10, 2002 || Palomar || NEAT || — || align=right | 3.1 km || 
|-id=100 bgcolor=#fefefe
| 287100 ||  || — || September 10, 2002 || Haleakala || NEAT || — || align=right | 1.2 km || 
|}

287101–287200 

|-bgcolor=#E9E9E9
| 287101 ||  || — || September 10, 2002 || Haleakala || NEAT || — || align=right | 2.3 km || 
|-id=102 bgcolor=#fefefe
| 287102 ||  || — || September 11, 2002 || Palomar || NEAT || — || align=right data-sort-value="0.95" | 950 m || 
|-id=103 bgcolor=#fefefe
| 287103 ||  || — || September 11, 2002 || Palomar || NEAT || MAS || align=right data-sort-value="0.68" | 680 m || 
|-id=104 bgcolor=#E9E9E9
| 287104 ||  || — || September 11, 2002 || Haleakala || NEAT || — || align=right | 2.9 km || 
|-id=105 bgcolor=#E9E9E9
| 287105 ||  || — || September 11, 2002 || Haleakala || NEAT || — || align=right | 2.4 km || 
|-id=106 bgcolor=#fefefe
| 287106 ||  || — || September 12, 2002 || Palomar || NEAT || H || align=right data-sort-value="0.90" | 900 m || 
|-id=107 bgcolor=#d6d6d6
| 287107 ||  || — || September 12, 2002 || Palomar || NEAT || — || align=right | 4.4 km || 
|-id=108 bgcolor=#E9E9E9
| 287108 ||  || — || September 13, 2002 || Kitt Peak || Spacewatch || — || align=right data-sort-value="0.91" | 910 m || 
|-id=109 bgcolor=#d6d6d6
| 287109 ||  || — || September 11, 2002 || Palomar || NEAT || EOS || align=right | 2.4 km || 
|-id=110 bgcolor=#fefefe
| 287110 ||  || — || September 12, 2002 || Palomar || NEAT || NYS || align=right data-sort-value="0.86" | 860 m || 
|-id=111 bgcolor=#d6d6d6
| 287111 ||  || — || September 12, 2002 || Palomar || NEAT || EUP || align=right | 4.8 km || 
|-id=112 bgcolor=#fefefe
| 287112 ||  || — || September 12, 2002 || Palomar || NEAT || V || align=right | 1.0 km || 
|-id=113 bgcolor=#d6d6d6
| 287113 ||  || — || September 12, 2002 || Palomar || NEAT || — || align=right | 2.8 km || 
|-id=114 bgcolor=#E9E9E9
| 287114 ||  || — || September 12, 2002 || Palomar || NEAT || — || align=right | 2.8 km || 
|-id=115 bgcolor=#E9E9E9
| 287115 ||  || — || September 13, 2002 || Palomar || NEAT || — || align=right | 1.9 km || 
|-id=116 bgcolor=#E9E9E9
| 287116 ||  || — || September 13, 2002 || Palomar || NEAT || — || align=right | 1.6 km || 
|-id=117 bgcolor=#fefefe
| 287117 ||  || — || September 13, 2002 || Palomar || NEAT || MAS || align=right data-sort-value="0.71" | 710 m || 
|-id=118 bgcolor=#E9E9E9
| 287118 ||  || — || September 13, 2002 || Palomar || NEAT || — || align=right | 1.8 km || 
|-id=119 bgcolor=#E9E9E9
| 287119 ||  || — || September 13, 2002 || Palomar || NEAT || — || align=right | 2.5 km || 
|-id=120 bgcolor=#E9E9E9
| 287120 ||  || — || September 13, 2002 || Palomar || NEAT || — || align=right | 2.9 km || 
|-id=121 bgcolor=#E9E9E9
| 287121 ||  || — || September 14, 2002 || Palomar || NEAT || HEN || align=right | 1.3 km || 
|-id=122 bgcolor=#fefefe
| 287122 ||  || — || September 13, 2002 || Goodricke-Pigott || R. A. Tucker || H || align=right data-sort-value="0.68" | 680 m || 
|-id=123 bgcolor=#E9E9E9
| 287123 ||  || — || September 11, 2002 || Palomar || NEAT || KRM || align=right | 3.0 km || 
|-id=124 bgcolor=#E9E9E9
| 287124 ||  || — || September 11, 2002 || Palomar || NEAT || — || align=right | 3.9 km || 
|-id=125 bgcolor=#fefefe
| 287125 ||  || — || September 11, 2002 || Palomar || NEAT || — || align=right | 1.3 km || 
|-id=126 bgcolor=#fefefe
| 287126 ||  || — || September 12, 2002 || Palomar || NEAT || — || align=right data-sort-value="0.94" | 940 m || 
|-id=127 bgcolor=#E9E9E9
| 287127 ||  || — || September 12, 2002 || Palomar || NEAT || — || align=right | 2.9 km || 
|-id=128 bgcolor=#E9E9E9
| 287128 ||  || — || September 12, 2002 || Palomar || NEAT || — || align=right | 3.2 km || 
|-id=129 bgcolor=#E9E9E9
| 287129 ||  || — || September 12, 2002 || Palomar || NEAT || — || align=right | 2.7 km || 
|-id=130 bgcolor=#E9E9E9
| 287130 ||  || — || September 13, 2002 || Palomar || NEAT || — || align=right | 1.4 km || 
|-id=131 bgcolor=#E9E9E9
| 287131 ||  || — || September 15, 2002 || Palomar || NEAT || — || align=right | 1.9 km || 
|-id=132 bgcolor=#fefefe
| 287132 ||  || — || September 12, 2002 || Palomar || NEAT || — || align=right data-sort-value="0.96" | 960 m || 
|-id=133 bgcolor=#E9E9E9
| 287133 ||  || — || September 12, 2002 || Palomar || NEAT || — || align=right | 1.9 km || 
|-id=134 bgcolor=#E9E9E9
| 287134 ||  || — || September 12, 2002 || Palomar || NEAT || — || align=right | 1.9 km || 
|-id=135 bgcolor=#E9E9E9
| 287135 ||  || — || September 13, 2002 || Palomar || NEAT || — || align=right data-sort-value="0.94" | 940 m || 
|-id=136 bgcolor=#fefefe
| 287136 ||  || — || September 13, 2002 || Socorro || LINEAR || MAS || align=right | 1.0 km || 
|-id=137 bgcolor=#fefefe
| 287137 ||  || — || September 13, 2002 || Socorro || LINEAR || — || align=right | 1.1 km || 
|-id=138 bgcolor=#d6d6d6
| 287138 ||  || — || September 13, 2002 || Palomar || NEAT || — || align=right | 3.3 km || 
|-id=139 bgcolor=#fefefe
| 287139 ||  || — || September 14, 2002 || Palomar || NEAT || — || align=right | 1.2 km || 
|-id=140 bgcolor=#fefefe
| 287140 ||  || — || September 14, 2002 || Haleakala || NEAT || — || align=right | 1.1 km || 
|-id=141 bgcolor=#E9E9E9
| 287141 ||  || — || September 13, 2002 || Kitt Peak || Spacewatch || — || align=right | 2.4 km || 
|-id=142 bgcolor=#E9E9E9
| 287142 ||  || — || September 13, 2002 || Socorro || LINEAR || — || align=right | 1.1 km || 
|-id=143 bgcolor=#E9E9E9
| 287143 ||  || — || September 13, 2002 || Socorro || LINEAR || EUN || align=right | 1.4 km || 
|-id=144 bgcolor=#E9E9E9
| 287144 ||  || — || September 15, 2002 || Palomar || NEAT || — || align=right | 1.8 km || 
|-id=145 bgcolor=#fefefe
| 287145 ||  || — || September 15, 2002 || Palomar || NEAT || NYS || align=right data-sort-value="0.75" | 750 m || 
|-id=146 bgcolor=#E9E9E9
| 287146 ||  || — || September 13, 2002 || Palomar || NEAT || — || align=right | 1.2 km || 
|-id=147 bgcolor=#E9E9E9
| 287147 ||  || — || September 14, 2002 || Palomar || NEAT || — || align=right | 1.1 km || 
|-id=148 bgcolor=#E9E9E9
| 287148 ||  || — || September 14, 2002 || Palomar || NEAT || — || align=right | 2.1 km || 
|-id=149 bgcolor=#E9E9E9
| 287149 ||  || — || September 14, 2002 || Haleakala || NEAT || — || align=right | 1.9 km || 
|-id=150 bgcolor=#E9E9E9
| 287150 ||  || — || September 14, 2002 || Haleakala || NEAT || — || align=right | 1.5 km || 
|-id=151 bgcolor=#E9E9E9
| 287151 ||  || — || September 14, 2002 || Palomar || NEAT || — || align=right | 1.6 km || 
|-id=152 bgcolor=#E9E9E9
| 287152 ||  || — || September 14, 2002 || Palomar || NEAT || — || align=right | 1.9 km || 
|-id=153 bgcolor=#E9E9E9
| 287153 ||  || — || September 14, 2002 || Palomar || R. Matson || — || align=right | 3.4 km || 
|-id=154 bgcolor=#E9E9E9
| 287154 ||  || — || September 14, 2002 || Palomar || R. Matson || — || align=right | 1.4 km || 
|-id=155 bgcolor=#E9E9E9
| 287155 ||  || — || September 14, 2002 || Palomar || R. Matson || — || align=right | 1.7 km || 
|-id=156 bgcolor=#d6d6d6
| 287156 ||  || — || September 14, 2002 || Palomar || R. Matson || — || align=right | 3.1 km || 
|-id=157 bgcolor=#E9E9E9
| 287157 ||  || — || September 11, 2002 || Palomar || M. White, M. Collins || — || align=right | 2.0 km || 
|-id=158 bgcolor=#d6d6d6
| 287158 ||  || — || September 14, 2002 || Palomar || R. Matson || — || align=right | 3.3 km || 
|-id=159 bgcolor=#fefefe
| 287159 ||  || — || September 14, 2002 || Palomar || R. Matson || MAS || align=right data-sort-value="0.86" | 860 m || 
|-id=160 bgcolor=#d6d6d6
| 287160 ||  || — || September 9, 2002 || Haleakala || R. Matson || KOR || align=right | 1.7 km || 
|-id=161 bgcolor=#E9E9E9
| 287161 ||  || — || September 11, 2002 || Haleakala || S. F. Hönig || — || align=right | 1.1 km || 
|-id=162 bgcolor=#d6d6d6
| 287162 ||  || — || September 11, 2002 || Haleakala || S. F. Hönig || — || align=right | 3.4 km || 
|-id=163 bgcolor=#E9E9E9
| 287163 ||  || — || September 14, 2002 || Palomar || NEAT || ADE || align=right | 2.4 km || 
|-id=164 bgcolor=#fefefe
| 287164 ||  || — || September 14, 2002 || Palomar || NEAT || V || align=right data-sort-value="0.79" | 790 m || 
|-id=165 bgcolor=#fefefe
| 287165 ||  || — || September 15, 2002 || Palomar || NEAT || — || align=right data-sort-value="0.86" | 860 m || 
|-id=166 bgcolor=#fefefe
| 287166 ||  || — || September 14, 2002 || Palomar || NEAT || FLO || align=right data-sort-value="0.67" | 670 m || 
|-id=167 bgcolor=#E9E9E9
| 287167 ||  || — || September 4, 2002 || Palomar || NEAT || — || align=right | 1.8 km || 
|-id=168 bgcolor=#E9E9E9
| 287168 ||  || — || September 3, 2002 || Palomar || NEAT || — || align=right | 2.6 km || 
|-id=169 bgcolor=#E9E9E9
| 287169 ||  || — || September 14, 2002 || Palomar || NEAT || WIT || align=right | 1.2 km || 
|-id=170 bgcolor=#E9E9E9
| 287170 ||  || — || September 12, 2002 || Palomar || NEAT || — || align=right | 1.8 km || 
|-id=171 bgcolor=#E9E9E9
| 287171 ||  || — || September 14, 2002 || Palomar || NEAT || — || align=right | 2.3 km || 
|-id=172 bgcolor=#d6d6d6
| 287172 ||  || — || September 14, 2002 || Palomar || NEAT || — || align=right | 3.0 km || 
|-id=173 bgcolor=#fefefe
| 287173 ||  || — || September 14, 2002 || Palomar || NEAT || MAS || align=right data-sort-value="0.84" | 840 m || 
|-id=174 bgcolor=#d6d6d6
| 287174 ||  || — || September 14, 2002 || Palomar || NEAT || — || align=right | 3.7 km || 
|-id=175 bgcolor=#E9E9E9
| 287175 ||  || — || September 13, 2002 || Palomar || Palomar Obs. || — || align=right | 2.0 km || 
|-id=176 bgcolor=#E9E9E9
| 287176 ||  || — || September 13, 2002 || Palomar || NEAT || WIT || align=right | 1.0 km || 
|-id=177 bgcolor=#E9E9E9
| 287177 ||  || — || September 13, 2002 || Palomar || NEAT || — || align=right | 3.1 km || 
|-id=178 bgcolor=#d6d6d6
| 287178 ||  || — || September 3, 2002 || Palomar || NEAT || — || align=right | 4.1 km || 
|-id=179 bgcolor=#E9E9E9
| 287179 ||  || — || September 13, 2002 || Palomar || NEAT || GEF || align=right | 1.6 km || 
|-id=180 bgcolor=#fefefe
| 287180 ||  || — || September 4, 2002 || Palomar || NEAT || FLO || align=right data-sort-value="0.76" | 760 m || 
|-id=181 bgcolor=#E9E9E9
| 287181 ||  || — || September 4, 2002 || Palomar || NEAT || — || align=right | 1.8 km || 
|-id=182 bgcolor=#d6d6d6
| 287182 ||  || — || September 4, 2002 || Palomar || NEAT || — || align=right | 3.1 km || 
|-id=183 bgcolor=#E9E9E9
| 287183 ||  || — || September 4, 2002 || Palomar || NEAT || PAD || align=right | 2.2 km || 
|-id=184 bgcolor=#E9E9E9
| 287184 ||  || — || September 4, 2002 || Palomar || NEAT || — || align=right | 2.7 km || 
|-id=185 bgcolor=#fefefe
| 287185 ||  || — || September 4, 2002 || Palomar || NEAT || — || align=right data-sort-value="0.93" | 930 m || 
|-id=186 bgcolor=#E9E9E9
| 287186 ||  || — || September 14, 2002 || Palomar || NEAT || AGN || align=right | 1.4 km || 
|-id=187 bgcolor=#E9E9E9
| 287187 ||  || — || January 19, 2009 || Mount Lemmon || Mount Lemmon Survey || ADE || align=right | 4.1 km || 
|-id=188 bgcolor=#d6d6d6
| 287188 ||  || — || September 16, 2002 || Palomar || NEAT || — || align=right | 4.0 km || 
|-id=189 bgcolor=#fefefe
| 287189 ||  || — || September 26, 2002 || Palomar || NEAT || NYS || align=right data-sort-value="0.64" | 640 m || 
|-id=190 bgcolor=#fefefe
| 287190 ||  || — || September 27, 2002 || Palomar || NEAT || H || align=right data-sort-value="0.72" | 720 m || 
|-id=191 bgcolor=#E9E9E9
| 287191 ||  || — || September 27, 2002 || Palomar || NEAT || — || align=right | 2.6 km || 
|-id=192 bgcolor=#E9E9E9
| 287192 ||  || — || September 27, 2002 || Palomar || NEAT || — || align=right | 2.7 km || 
|-id=193 bgcolor=#d6d6d6
| 287193 ||  || — || September 27, 2002 || Palomar || NEAT || — || align=right | 4.7 km || 
|-id=194 bgcolor=#E9E9E9
| 287194 ||  || — || September 28, 2002 || Palomar || NEAT || — || align=right | 1.7 km || 
|-id=195 bgcolor=#E9E9E9
| 287195 ||  || — || September 26, 2002 || Socorro || LINEAR || — || align=right | 3.5 km || 
|-id=196 bgcolor=#d6d6d6
| 287196 ||  || — || September 26, 2002 || Palomar || NEAT || — || align=right | 3.5 km || 
|-id=197 bgcolor=#E9E9E9
| 287197 ||  || — || September 27, 2002 || Palomar || NEAT || — || align=right | 2.1 km || 
|-id=198 bgcolor=#fefefe
| 287198 ||  || — || September 27, 2002 || Palomar || NEAT || NYS || align=right data-sort-value="0.75" | 750 m || 
|-id=199 bgcolor=#fefefe
| 287199 ||  || — || September 27, 2002 || Palomar || NEAT || — || align=right data-sort-value="0.97" | 970 m || 
|-id=200 bgcolor=#E9E9E9
| 287200 ||  || — || September 27, 2002 || Palomar || NEAT || — || align=right | 1.5 km || 
|}

287201–287300 

|-bgcolor=#d6d6d6
| 287201 ||  || — || September 26, 2002 || Palomar || NEAT || TIR || align=right | 3.8 km || 
|-id=202 bgcolor=#E9E9E9
| 287202 ||  || — || September 28, 2002 || Haleakala || NEAT || — || align=right | 2.8 km || 
|-id=203 bgcolor=#E9E9E9
| 287203 ||  || — || September 28, 2002 || Haleakala || NEAT || DOR || align=right | 3.8 km || 
|-id=204 bgcolor=#E9E9E9
| 287204 ||  || — || September 29, 2002 || Haleakala || NEAT || — || align=right | 2.2 km || 
|-id=205 bgcolor=#fefefe
| 287205 ||  || — || September 28, 2002 || Haleakala || NEAT || — || align=right | 1.3 km || 
|-id=206 bgcolor=#fefefe
| 287206 ||  || — || September 29, 2002 || Haleakala || NEAT || — || align=right | 1.2 km || 
|-id=207 bgcolor=#d6d6d6
| 287207 ||  || — || September 29, 2002 || Haleakala || NEAT || 3:2 || align=right | 6.5 km || 
|-id=208 bgcolor=#fefefe
| 287208 ||  || — || September 20, 2002 || Palomar || NEAT || — || align=right | 1.2 km || 
|-id=209 bgcolor=#d6d6d6
| 287209 ||  || — || September 30, 2002 || Socorro || LINEAR || — || align=right | 4.0 km || 
|-id=210 bgcolor=#E9E9E9
| 287210 ||  || — || September 17, 2002 || Palomar || NEAT || — || align=right | 1.8 km || 
|-id=211 bgcolor=#E9E9E9
| 287211 ||  || — || September 16, 2002 || Palomar || NEAT || — || align=right | 1.3 km || 
|-id=212 bgcolor=#E9E9E9
| 287212 ||  || — || September 26, 2002 || Palomar || NEAT || — || align=right | 1.9 km || 
|-id=213 bgcolor=#E9E9E9
| 287213 ||  || — || September 26, 2002 || Palomar || NEAT || — || align=right | 2.1 km || 
|-id=214 bgcolor=#E9E9E9
| 287214 ||  || — || September 26, 2002 || Palomar || NEAT || HOF || align=right | 3.0 km || 
|-id=215 bgcolor=#E9E9E9
| 287215 ||  || — || September 16, 2002 || Palomar || NEAT || AGN || align=right | 1.1 km || 
|-id=216 bgcolor=#d6d6d6
| 287216 ||  || — || September 16, 2002 || Palomar || NEAT || — || align=right | 3.2 km || 
|-id=217 bgcolor=#fefefe
| 287217 ||  || — || February 16, 2004 || Kitt Peak || Spacewatch || — || align=right | 1.0 km || 
|-id=218 bgcolor=#E9E9E9
| 287218 ||  || — || September 26, 2002 || Palomar || NEAT || — || align=right | 1.6 km || 
|-id=219 bgcolor=#fefefe
| 287219 ||  || — || September 16, 2002 || Palomar || NEAT || NYS || align=right data-sort-value="0.79" | 790 m || 
|-id=220 bgcolor=#d6d6d6
| 287220 ||  || — || September 16, 2002 || Palomar || NEAT || — || align=right | 5.2 km || 
|-id=221 bgcolor=#fefefe
| 287221 ||  || — || October 1, 2002 || Anderson Mesa || LONEOS || NYS || align=right data-sort-value="0.95" | 950 m || 
|-id=222 bgcolor=#E9E9E9
| 287222 ||  || — || October 1, 2002 || Socorro || LINEAR || — || align=right | 2.9 km || 
|-id=223 bgcolor=#E9E9E9
| 287223 ||  || — || October 2, 2002 || Campo Imperatore || CINEOS || — || align=right | 2.7 km || 
|-id=224 bgcolor=#E9E9E9
| 287224 ||  || — || October 1, 2002 || Anderson Mesa || LONEOS || — || align=right | 1.9 km || 
|-id=225 bgcolor=#fefefe
| 287225 ||  || — || October 1, 2002 || Anderson Mesa || LONEOS || MAS || align=right data-sort-value="0.91" | 910 m || 
|-id=226 bgcolor=#E9E9E9
| 287226 ||  || — || October 1, 2002 || Anderson Mesa || LONEOS || AEO || align=right | 1.5 km || 
|-id=227 bgcolor=#fefefe
| 287227 ||  || — || October 2, 2002 || Socorro || LINEAR || MAS || align=right data-sort-value="0.75" | 750 m || 
|-id=228 bgcolor=#E9E9E9
| 287228 ||  || — || October 2, 2002 || Socorro || LINEAR || ADE || align=right | 2.0 km || 
|-id=229 bgcolor=#fefefe
| 287229 ||  || — || October 2, 2002 || Socorro || LINEAR || NYS || align=right data-sort-value="0.76" | 760 m || 
|-id=230 bgcolor=#E9E9E9
| 287230 ||  || — || October 2, 2002 || Socorro || LINEAR || — || align=right | 2.5 km || 
|-id=231 bgcolor=#E9E9E9
| 287231 ||  || — || October 2, 2002 || Socorro || LINEAR || — || align=right | 1.8 km || 
|-id=232 bgcolor=#fefefe
| 287232 ||  || — || October 2, 2002 || Socorro || LINEAR || — || align=right | 1.4 km || 
|-id=233 bgcolor=#E9E9E9
| 287233 ||  || — || October 2, 2002 || Socorro || LINEAR || HNA || align=right | 3.3 km || 
|-id=234 bgcolor=#E9E9E9
| 287234 ||  || — || October 2, 2002 || Socorro || LINEAR || — || align=right | 2.8 km || 
|-id=235 bgcolor=#E9E9E9
| 287235 ||  || — || October 2, 2002 || Socorro || LINEAR || MIS || align=right | 3.2 km || 
|-id=236 bgcolor=#E9E9E9
| 287236 ||  || — || October 2, 2002 || Socorro || LINEAR || — || align=right | 2.8 km || 
|-id=237 bgcolor=#E9E9E9
| 287237 ||  || — || October 2, 2002 || Socorro || LINEAR || — || align=right | 3.4 km || 
|-id=238 bgcolor=#fefefe
| 287238 ||  || — || October 2, 2002 || Haleakala || NEAT || — || align=right data-sort-value="0.82" | 820 m || 
|-id=239 bgcolor=#E9E9E9
| 287239 ||  || — || October 2, 2002 || Socorro || LINEAR || — || align=right | 3.1 km || 
|-id=240 bgcolor=#E9E9E9
| 287240 ||  || — || October 2, 2002 || Socorro || LINEAR || — || align=right | 3.9 km || 
|-id=241 bgcolor=#fefefe
| 287241 ||  || — || October 1, 2002 || Anderson Mesa || LONEOS || — || align=right | 1.4 km || 
|-id=242 bgcolor=#E9E9E9
| 287242 ||  || — || October 2, 2002 || Socorro || LINEAR || — || align=right | 2.3 km || 
|-id=243 bgcolor=#E9E9E9
| 287243 ||  || — || October 3, 2002 || Campo Imperatore || CINEOS || PAD || align=right | 2.1 km || 
|-id=244 bgcolor=#E9E9E9
| 287244 ||  || — || October 3, 2002 || Campo Imperatore || CINEOS || — || align=right | 2.2 km || 
|-id=245 bgcolor=#fefefe
| 287245 ||  || — || October 4, 2002 || Campo Imperatore || CINEOS || — || align=right | 1.1 km || 
|-id=246 bgcolor=#fefefe
| 287246 ||  || — || October 4, 2002 || Campo Imperatore || CINEOS || — || align=right data-sort-value="0.80" | 800 m || 
|-id=247 bgcolor=#E9E9E9
| 287247 ||  || — || October 4, 2002 || Socorro || LINEAR || — || align=right | 3.1 km || 
|-id=248 bgcolor=#E9E9E9
| 287248 ||  || — || October 9, 2002 || Uccle || T. Pauwels || — || align=right | 2.9 km || 
|-id=249 bgcolor=#d6d6d6
| 287249 ||  || — || October 3, 2002 || Palomar || NEAT || — || align=right | 4.0 km || 
|-id=250 bgcolor=#E9E9E9
| 287250 ||  || — || October 3, 2002 || Palomar || NEAT || — || align=right | 2.9 km || 
|-id=251 bgcolor=#fefefe
| 287251 ||  || — || October 11, 2002 || Palomar || NEAT || V || align=right data-sort-value="0.86" | 860 m || 
|-id=252 bgcolor=#E9E9E9
| 287252 ||  || — || October 4, 2002 || Anderson Mesa || LONEOS || — || align=right | 2.3 km || 
|-id=253 bgcolor=#fefefe
| 287253 ||  || — || October 4, 2002 || Socorro || LINEAR || — || align=right | 1.3 km || 
|-id=254 bgcolor=#fefefe
| 287254 ||  || — || October 4, 2002 || Socorro || LINEAR || — || align=right data-sort-value="0.90" | 900 m || 
|-id=255 bgcolor=#d6d6d6
| 287255 ||  || — || October 4, 2002 || Socorro || LINEAR || — || align=right | 4.0 km || 
|-id=256 bgcolor=#E9E9E9
| 287256 ||  || — || October 3, 2002 || Palomar || NEAT || GEF || align=right | 1.8 km || 
|-id=257 bgcolor=#fefefe
| 287257 ||  || — || October 3, 2002 || Palomar || NEAT || H || align=right data-sort-value="0.69" | 690 m || 
|-id=258 bgcolor=#E9E9E9
| 287258 ||  || — || October 4, 2002 || Palomar || NEAT || DOR || align=right | 3.6 km || 
|-id=259 bgcolor=#E9E9E9
| 287259 ||  || — || September 3, 2002 || Palomar || NEAT || ADE || align=right | 3.1 km || 
|-id=260 bgcolor=#d6d6d6
| 287260 ||  || — || October 4, 2002 || Palomar || NEAT || — || align=right | 3.4 km || 
|-id=261 bgcolor=#E9E9E9
| 287261 ||  || — || October 4, 2002 || Palomar || NEAT || — || align=right | 3.8 km || 
|-id=262 bgcolor=#d6d6d6
| 287262 ||  || — || October 4, 2002 || Anderson Mesa || LONEOS || — || align=right | 4.2 km || 
|-id=263 bgcolor=#E9E9E9
| 287263 ||  || — || October 2, 2002 || Campo Imperatore || CINEOS || — || align=right | 2.9 km || 
|-id=264 bgcolor=#d6d6d6
| 287264 ||  || — || October 2, 2002 || Campo Imperatore || CINEOS || — || align=right | 6.6 km || 
|-id=265 bgcolor=#fefefe
| 287265 ||  || — || October 4, 2002 || Socorro || LINEAR || — || align=right | 1.3 km || 
|-id=266 bgcolor=#E9E9E9
| 287266 ||  || — || October 5, 2002 || Palomar || NEAT || — || align=right | 3.9 km || 
|-id=267 bgcolor=#E9E9E9
| 287267 ||  || — || October 5, 2002 || Palomar || NEAT || — || align=right | 2.5 km || 
|-id=268 bgcolor=#fefefe
| 287268 ||  || — || October 5, 2002 || Palomar || NEAT || — || align=right data-sort-value="0.89" | 890 m || 
|-id=269 bgcolor=#d6d6d6
| 287269 ||  || — || October 5, 2002 || Kitt Peak || Spacewatch || — || align=right | 5.0 km || 
|-id=270 bgcolor=#E9E9E9
| 287270 ||  || — || October 5, 2002 || Palomar || NEAT || — || align=right | 1.5 km || 
|-id=271 bgcolor=#d6d6d6
| 287271 ||  || — || October 5, 2002 || Palomar || NEAT || EOS || align=right | 2.7 km || 
|-id=272 bgcolor=#d6d6d6
| 287272 ||  || — || October 5, 2002 || Palomar || NEAT || — || align=right | 4.1 km || 
|-id=273 bgcolor=#E9E9E9
| 287273 ||  || — || October 5, 2002 || Palomar || NEAT || JUN || align=right | 1.3 km || 
|-id=274 bgcolor=#d6d6d6
| 287274 ||  || — || October 5, 2002 || Palomar || NEAT || EUP || align=right | 4.8 km || 
|-id=275 bgcolor=#E9E9E9
| 287275 ||  || — || October 3, 2002 || Palomar || NEAT || — || align=right | 2.3 km || 
|-id=276 bgcolor=#E9E9E9
| 287276 ||  || — || October 3, 2002 || Palomar || NEAT || — || align=right | 3.5 km || 
|-id=277 bgcolor=#d6d6d6
| 287277 ||  || — || October 3, 2002 || Palomar || NEAT || — || align=right | 4.3 km || 
|-id=278 bgcolor=#E9E9E9
| 287278 ||  || — || October 3, 2002 || Palomar || NEAT || — || align=right | 3.1 km || 
|-id=279 bgcolor=#fefefe
| 287279 ||  || — || October 3, 2002 || Palomar || NEAT || — || align=right | 1.2 km || 
|-id=280 bgcolor=#E9E9E9
| 287280 ||  || — || October 4, 2002 || Palomar || NEAT || INO || align=right | 2.0 km || 
|-id=281 bgcolor=#E9E9E9
| 287281 ||  || — || September 7, 2002 || Socorro || LINEAR || DOR || align=right | 3.0 km || 
|-id=282 bgcolor=#fefefe
| 287282 ||  || — || October 4, 2002 || Anderson Mesa || LONEOS || — || align=right | 1.1 km || 
|-id=283 bgcolor=#E9E9E9
| 287283 ||  || — || October 5, 2002 || Palomar || NEAT || — || align=right | 4.2 km || 
|-id=284 bgcolor=#d6d6d6
| 287284 ||  || — || October 3, 2002 || Socorro || LINEAR || SHU3:2 || align=right | 7.6 km || 
|-id=285 bgcolor=#E9E9E9
| 287285 ||  || — || October 4, 2002 || Socorro || LINEAR || — || align=right | 4.3 km || 
|-id=286 bgcolor=#fefefe
| 287286 ||  || — || October 4, 2002 || Socorro || LINEAR || FLO || align=right data-sort-value="0.89" | 890 m || 
|-id=287 bgcolor=#E9E9E9
| 287287 ||  || — || October 5, 2002 || Anderson Mesa || LONEOS || — || align=right | 3.4 km || 
|-id=288 bgcolor=#fefefe
| 287288 ||  || — || October 3, 2002 || Socorro || LINEAR || — || align=right | 1.2 km || 
|-id=289 bgcolor=#E9E9E9
| 287289 ||  || — || October 3, 2002 || Socorro || LINEAR || — || align=right | 2.9 km || 
|-id=290 bgcolor=#E9E9E9
| 287290 ||  || — || October 3, 2002 || Socorro || LINEAR || — || align=right | 2.5 km || 
|-id=291 bgcolor=#E9E9E9
| 287291 ||  || — || October 4, 2002 || Kitt Peak || Spacewatch || — || align=right | 2.3 km || 
|-id=292 bgcolor=#d6d6d6
| 287292 ||  || — || October 4, 2002 || Socorro || LINEAR || 3:2 || align=right | 6.2 km || 
|-id=293 bgcolor=#E9E9E9
| 287293 ||  || — || October 4, 2002 || Socorro || LINEAR || — || align=right | 3.3 km || 
|-id=294 bgcolor=#d6d6d6
| 287294 ||  || — || October 9, 2002 || Bergisch Gladbach || W. Bickel || THM || align=right | 2.4 km || 
|-id=295 bgcolor=#E9E9E9
| 287295 ||  || — || October 4, 2002 || Socorro || LINEAR || RAF || align=right | 1.0 km || 
|-id=296 bgcolor=#fefefe
| 287296 ||  || — || October 4, 2002 || Socorro || LINEAR || — || align=right | 1.0 km || 
|-id=297 bgcolor=#E9E9E9
| 287297 ||  || — || October 4, 2002 || Socorro || LINEAR || — || align=right | 3.0 km || 
|-id=298 bgcolor=#fefefe
| 287298 ||  || — || October 4, 2002 || Socorro || LINEAR || — || align=right data-sort-value="0.90" | 900 m || 
|-id=299 bgcolor=#fefefe
| 287299 ||  || — || October 4, 2002 || Socorro || LINEAR || — || align=right | 1.2 km || 
|-id=300 bgcolor=#E9E9E9
| 287300 ||  || — || October 4, 2002 || Socorro || LINEAR || — || align=right | 2.4 km || 
|}

287301–287400 

|-bgcolor=#E9E9E9
| 287301 ||  || — || October 6, 2002 || Socorro || LINEAR || — || align=right | 3.0 km || 
|-id=302 bgcolor=#fefefe
| 287302 ||  || — || October 4, 2002 || Socorro || LINEAR || — || align=right data-sort-value="0.88" | 880 m || 
|-id=303 bgcolor=#E9E9E9
| 287303 ||  || — || October 4, 2002 || Socorro || LINEAR || — || align=right | 3.6 km || 
|-id=304 bgcolor=#fefefe
| 287304 ||  || — || October 7, 2002 || Socorro || LINEAR || — || align=right data-sort-value="0.71" | 710 m || 
|-id=305 bgcolor=#E9E9E9
| 287305 ||  || — || October 5, 2002 || Socorro || LINEAR || — || align=right | 2.1 km || 
|-id=306 bgcolor=#fefefe
| 287306 ||  || — || October 7, 2002 || Haleakala || NEAT || NYS || align=right data-sort-value="0.95" | 950 m || 
|-id=307 bgcolor=#E9E9E9
| 287307 ||  || — || October 8, 2002 || Palomar || NEAT || HNS || align=right | 1.8 km || 
|-id=308 bgcolor=#E9E9E9
| 287308 ||  || — || October 6, 2002 || Socorro || LINEAR || INO || align=right | 1.5 km || 
|-id=309 bgcolor=#E9E9E9
| 287309 ||  || — || October 9, 2002 || Socorro || LINEAR || — || align=right | 3.2 km || 
|-id=310 bgcolor=#d6d6d6
| 287310 ||  || — || October 10, 2002 || Palomar || NEAT || — || align=right | 3.3 km || 
|-id=311 bgcolor=#fefefe
| 287311 ||  || — || October 7, 2002 || Socorro || LINEAR || — || align=right | 1.2 km || 
|-id=312 bgcolor=#E9E9E9
| 287312 ||  || — || October 7, 2002 || Socorro || LINEAR || — || align=right | 2.4 km || 
|-id=313 bgcolor=#fefefe
| 287313 ||  || — || October 8, 2002 || Anderson Mesa || LONEOS || V || align=right data-sort-value="0.85" | 850 m || 
|-id=314 bgcolor=#E9E9E9
| 287314 ||  || — || October 9, 2002 || Socorro || LINEAR || — || align=right | 1.2 km || 
|-id=315 bgcolor=#fefefe
| 287315 ||  || — || October 9, 2002 || Socorro || LINEAR || NYS || align=right data-sort-value="0.77" | 770 m || 
|-id=316 bgcolor=#d6d6d6
| 287316 ||  || — || October 9, 2002 || Socorro || LINEAR || — || align=right | 3.9 km || 
|-id=317 bgcolor=#E9E9E9
| 287317 ||  || — || October 9, 2002 || Socorro || LINEAR || — || align=right | 4.1 km || 
|-id=318 bgcolor=#E9E9E9
| 287318 ||  || — || October 10, 2002 || Palomar || NEAT || — || align=right | 2.8 km || 
|-id=319 bgcolor=#d6d6d6
| 287319 ||  || — || October 10, 2002 || Socorro || LINEAR || ALA || align=right | 6.3 km || 
|-id=320 bgcolor=#E9E9E9
| 287320 ||  || — || October 10, 2002 || Socorro || LINEAR || — || align=right | 2.5 km || 
|-id=321 bgcolor=#fefefe
| 287321 ||  || — || October 9, 2002 || Socorro || LINEAR || — || align=right | 1.3 km || 
|-id=322 bgcolor=#E9E9E9
| 287322 ||  || — || October 9, 2002 || Socorro || LINEAR || — || align=right | 1.0 km || 
|-id=323 bgcolor=#E9E9E9
| 287323 ||  || — || October 9, 2002 || Socorro || LINEAR || JUN || align=right | 1.2 km || 
|-id=324 bgcolor=#E9E9E9
| 287324 ||  || — || October 10, 2002 || Socorro || LINEAR || — || align=right | 4.2 km || 
|-id=325 bgcolor=#fefefe
| 287325 ||  || — || October 11, 2002 || Socorro || LINEAR || MAS || align=right data-sort-value="0.85" | 850 m || 
|-id=326 bgcolor=#E9E9E9
| 287326 ||  || — || October 12, 2002 || Socorro || LINEAR || — || align=right | 3.0 km || 
|-id=327 bgcolor=#d6d6d6
| 287327 ||  || — || October 4, 2002 || Apache Point || SDSS || EOS || align=right | 2.8 km || 
|-id=328 bgcolor=#d6d6d6
| 287328 ||  || — || October 4, 2002 || Apache Point || SDSS || — || align=right | 3.3 km || 
|-id=329 bgcolor=#d6d6d6
| 287329 ||  || — || October 4, 2002 || Apache Point || SDSS || — || align=right | 3.6 km || 
|-id=330 bgcolor=#E9E9E9
| 287330 ||  || — || October 4, 2002 || Apache Point || SDSS || EUN || align=right | 1.4 km || 
|-id=331 bgcolor=#E9E9E9
| 287331 ||  || — || October 4, 2002 || Apache Point || SDSS || MAR || align=right | 1.1 km || 
|-id=332 bgcolor=#E9E9E9
| 287332 ||  || — || October 4, 2002 || Apache Point || SDSS || — || align=right | 2.1 km || 
|-id=333 bgcolor=#E9E9E9
| 287333 ||  || — || October 4, 2002 || Apache Point || SDSS || — || align=right | 2.7 km || 
|-id=334 bgcolor=#d6d6d6
| 287334 ||  || — || October 4, 2002 || Apache Point || SDSS || — || align=right | 4.5 km || 
|-id=335 bgcolor=#E9E9E9
| 287335 ||  || — || October 4, 2002 || Apache Point || SDSS || — || align=right | 2.8 km || 
|-id=336 bgcolor=#fefefe
| 287336 ||  || — || October 5, 2002 || Apache Point || SDSS || — || align=right data-sort-value="0.72" | 720 m || 
|-id=337 bgcolor=#E9E9E9
| 287337 ||  || — || October 5, 2002 || Apache Point || SDSS || — || align=right | 2.4 km || 
|-id=338 bgcolor=#fefefe
| 287338 ||  || — || October 5, 2002 || Apache Point || SDSS || NYS || align=right data-sort-value="0.60" | 600 m || 
|-id=339 bgcolor=#d6d6d6
| 287339 ||  || — || October 5, 2002 || Apache Point || SDSS || — || align=right | 5.1 km || 
|-id=340 bgcolor=#E9E9E9
| 287340 ||  || — || October 5, 2002 || Apache Point || SDSS || WIT || align=right | 1.2 km || 
|-id=341 bgcolor=#E9E9E9
| 287341 ||  || — || October 5, 2002 || Apache Point || SDSS || PAE || align=right | 2.9 km || 
|-id=342 bgcolor=#d6d6d6
| 287342 ||  || — || October 10, 2002 || Apache Point || SDSS || — || align=right | 3.6 km || 
|-id=343 bgcolor=#E9E9E9
| 287343 ||  || — || October 10, 2002 || Apache Point || SDSS || GEF || align=right | 1.2 km || 
|-id=344 bgcolor=#E9E9E9
| 287344 ||  || — || October 10, 2002 || Apache Point || SDSS || — || align=right | 1.8 km || 
|-id=345 bgcolor=#d6d6d6
| 287345 ||  || — || October 10, 2002 || Apache Point || SDSS || KOR || align=right | 1.4 km || 
|-id=346 bgcolor=#d6d6d6
| 287346 ||  || — || October 10, 2002 || Apache Point || SDSS || — || align=right | 3.5 km || 
|-id=347 bgcolor=#E9E9E9
| 287347 Mézes ||  ||  || October 9, 2002 || Palomar || NEAT || WIT || align=right | 1.3 km || 
|-id=348 bgcolor=#fefefe
| 287348 ||  || — || October 15, 2002 || Palomar || NEAT || NYS || align=right data-sort-value="0.63" | 630 m || 
|-id=349 bgcolor=#fefefe
| 287349 ||  || — || October 13, 2002 || Kitt Peak || Spacewatch || V || align=right data-sort-value="0.96" | 960 m || 
|-id=350 bgcolor=#E9E9E9
| 287350 ||  || — || September 24, 1960 || Palomar || PLS || — || align=right | 3.0 km || 
|-id=351 bgcolor=#E9E9E9
| 287351 ||  || — || October 28, 2002 || Nogales || C. W. Juels, P. R. Holvorcem || — || align=right | 2.9 km || 
|-id=352 bgcolor=#E9E9E9
| 287352 ||  || — || October 28, 2002 || Palomar || NEAT || — || align=right | 3.5 km || 
|-id=353 bgcolor=#E9E9E9
| 287353 ||  || — || October 28, 2002 || Palomar || NEAT || — || align=right | 2.1 km || 
|-id=354 bgcolor=#fefefe
| 287354 ||  || — || October 29, 2002 || Kitt Peak || Spacewatch || NYS || align=right data-sort-value="0.79" | 790 m || 
|-id=355 bgcolor=#d6d6d6
| 287355 ||  || — || October 28, 2002 || Palomar || NEAT || — || align=right | 3.5 km || 
|-id=356 bgcolor=#E9E9E9
| 287356 ||  || — || October 28, 2002 || Haleakala || NEAT || — || align=right | 4.0 km || 
|-id=357 bgcolor=#fefefe
| 287357 ||  || — || October 30, 2002 || Palomar || NEAT || NYS || align=right data-sort-value="0.70" | 700 m || 
|-id=358 bgcolor=#E9E9E9
| 287358 ||  || — || October 31, 2002 || Anderson Mesa || LONEOS || — || align=right | 3.3 km || 
|-id=359 bgcolor=#E9E9E9
| 287359 ||  || — || October 31, 2002 || Socorro || LINEAR || — || align=right | 3.5 km || 
|-id=360 bgcolor=#E9E9E9
| 287360 ||  || — || October 31, 2002 || Palomar || NEAT || — || align=right | 3.0 km || 
|-id=361 bgcolor=#E9E9E9
| 287361 ||  || — || October 31, 2002 || Socorro || LINEAR || DOR || align=right | 3.7 km || 
|-id=362 bgcolor=#d6d6d6
| 287362 ||  || — || October 29, 2002 || Apache Point || SDSS || URS || align=right | 3.2 km || 
|-id=363 bgcolor=#fefefe
| 287363 ||  || — || October 29, 2002 || Apache Point || SDSS || FLO || align=right data-sort-value="0.74" | 740 m || 
|-id=364 bgcolor=#fefefe
| 287364 ||  || — || October 29, 2002 || Apache Point || SDSS || — || align=right | 1.2 km || 
|-id=365 bgcolor=#E9E9E9
| 287365 ||  || — || October 30, 2002 || Apache Point || SDSS || GEF || align=right | 1.5 km || 
|-id=366 bgcolor=#E9E9E9
| 287366 ||  || — || October 30, 2002 || Apache Point || SDSS || — || align=right | 1.6 km || 
|-id=367 bgcolor=#E9E9E9
| 287367 ||  || — || October 30, 2002 || Apache Point || SDSS || — || align=right | 2.1 km || 
|-id=368 bgcolor=#d6d6d6
| 287368 ||  || — || October 30, 2002 || Apache Point || SDSS || KOR || align=right | 1.3 km || 
|-id=369 bgcolor=#E9E9E9
| 287369 ||  || — || October 16, 2002 || Palomar || NEAT || — || align=right data-sort-value="0.79" | 790 m || 
|-id=370 bgcolor=#E9E9E9
| 287370 ||  || — || October 16, 2002 || Palomar || NEAT || — || align=right | 1.8 km || 
|-id=371 bgcolor=#E9E9E9
| 287371 ||  || — || October 16, 2002 || Palomar || NEAT || AGN || align=right | 1.5 km || 
|-id=372 bgcolor=#E9E9E9
| 287372 ||  || — || October 18, 2002 || Palomar || NEAT || AGN || align=right | 1.4 km || 
|-id=373 bgcolor=#fefefe
| 287373 ||  || — || October 18, 2002 || Palomar || NEAT || V || align=right data-sort-value="0.90" | 900 m || 
|-id=374 bgcolor=#d6d6d6
| 287374 Vreeland || 2002 VR ||  || November 2, 2002 || Wrightwood || J. W. Young || — || align=right | 2.1 km || 
|-id=375 bgcolor=#E9E9E9
| 287375 ||  || — || November 4, 2002 || Palomar || NEAT || — || align=right data-sort-value="0.94" | 940 m || 
|-id=376 bgcolor=#fefefe
| 287376 ||  || — || November 4, 2002 || Haleakala || NEAT || — || align=right | 1.5 km || 
|-id=377 bgcolor=#E9E9E9
| 287377 ||  || — || November 4, 2002 || Palomar || NEAT || NEM || align=right | 3.1 km || 
|-id=378 bgcolor=#fefefe
| 287378 ||  || — || November 4, 2002 || Kitt Peak || Spacewatch || H || align=right data-sort-value="0.81" | 810 m || 
|-id=379 bgcolor=#fefefe
| 287379 ||  || — || November 5, 2002 || Socorro || LINEAR || — || align=right data-sort-value="0.84" | 840 m || 
|-id=380 bgcolor=#E9E9E9
| 287380 ||  || — || November 4, 2002 || Palomar || NEAT || — || align=right | 2.7 km || 
|-id=381 bgcolor=#fefefe
| 287381 ||  || — || November 4, 2002 || Kitt Peak || Spacewatch || — || align=right data-sort-value="0.75" | 750 m || 
|-id=382 bgcolor=#fefefe
| 287382 ||  || — || November 5, 2002 || Socorro || LINEAR || — || align=right | 1.0 km || 
|-id=383 bgcolor=#fefefe
| 287383 ||  || — || November 5, 2002 || Socorro || LINEAR || — || align=right | 1.3 km || 
|-id=384 bgcolor=#fefefe
| 287384 ||  || — || November 5, 2002 || Socorro || LINEAR || V || align=right data-sort-value="0.97" | 970 m || 
|-id=385 bgcolor=#d6d6d6
| 287385 ||  || — || November 5, 2002 || Socorro || LINEAR || HIL3:2 || align=right | 7.5 km || 
|-id=386 bgcolor=#d6d6d6
| 287386 ||  || — || November 5, 2002 || Kitt Peak || Spacewatch || — || align=right | 3.6 km || 
|-id=387 bgcolor=#E9E9E9
| 287387 ||  || — || November 1, 2002 || Palomar || NEAT || — || align=right | 4.2 km || 
|-id=388 bgcolor=#E9E9E9
| 287388 ||  || — || November 4, 2002 || Palomar || NEAT || — || align=right | 4.5 km || 
|-id=389 bgcolor=#fefefe
| 287389 ||  || — || November 6, 2002 || Socorro || LINEAR || — || align=right data-sort-value="0.65" | 650 m || 
|-id=390 bgcolor=#d6d6d6
| 287390 ||  || — || November 6, 2002 || Socorro || LINEAR || — || align=right | 5.2 km || 
|-id=391 bgcolor=#d6d6d6
| 287391 ||  || — || November 7, 2002 || Anderson Mesa || LONEOS || — || align=right | 5.4 km || 
|-id=392 bgcolor=#E9E9E9
| 287392 ||  || — || November 7, 2002 || Socorro || LINEAR || — || align=right | 3.4 km || 
|-id=393 bgcolor=#d6d6d6
| 287393 ||  || — || November 7, 2002 || Socorro || LINEAR || — || align=right | 3.5 km || 
|-id=394 bgcolor=#d6d6d6
| 287394 ||  || — || November 7, 2002 || Socorro || LINEAR || — || align=right | 3.3 km || 
|-id=395 bgcolor=#fefefe
| 287395 ||  || — || November 7, 2002 || Socorro || LINEAR || FLO || align=right data-sort-value="0.87" | 870 m || 
|-id=396 bgcolor=#FA8072
| 287396 ||  || — || November 8, 2002 || Socorro || LINEAR || — || align=right | 1.2 km || 
|-id=397 bgcolor=#d6d6d6
| 287397 ||  || — || November 11, 2002 || Kitt Peak || Spacewatch || — || align=right | 2.8 km || 
|-id=398 bgcolor=#E9E9E9
| 287398 ||  || — || November 11, 2002 || Socorro || LINEAR || DOR || align=right | 3.3 km || 
|-id=399 bgcolor=#fefefe
| 287399 ||  || — || November 11, 2002 || Essen || Walter Hohmann Obs. || FLO || align=right data-sort-value="0.89" | 890 m || 
|-id=400 bgcolor=#FA8072
| 287400 ||  || — || November 14, 2002 || Socorro || LINEAR || — || align=right data-sort-value="0.96" | 960 m || 
|}

287401–287500 

|-bgcolor=#fefefe
| 287401 ||  || — || November 12, 2002 || Socorro || LINEAR || — || align=right | 1.1 km || 
|-id=402 bgcolor=#d6d6d6
| 287402 ||  || — || November 12, 2002 || Socorro || LINEAR || — || align=right | 3.6 km || 
|-id=403 bgcolor=#E9E9E9
| 287403 ||  || — || November 12, 2002 || Socorro || LINEAR || WIT || align=right | 1.6 km || 
|-id=404 bgcolor=#fefefe
| 287404 ||  || — || November 12, 2002 || Socorro || LINEAR || — || align=right | 1.2 km || 
|-id=405 bgcolor=#E9E9E9
| 287405 ||  || — || November 13, 2002 || Palomar || NEAT || — || align=right | 2.2 km || 
|-id=406 bgcolor=#E9E9E9
| 287406 ||  || — || November 13, 2002 || Palomar || NEAT || ADE || align=right | 2.0 km || 
|-id=407 bgcolor=#E9E9E9
| 287407 ||  || — || November 11, 2002 || Anderson Mesa || LONEOS || — || align=right | 1.4 km || 
|-id=408 bgcolor=#fefefe
| 287408 ||  || — || November 13, 2002 || Palomar || NEAT || — || align=right | 1.2 km || 
|-id=409 bgcolor=#fefefe
| 287409 ||  || — || November 13, 2002 || Palomar || NEAT || — || align=right | 1.5 km || 
|-id=410 bgcolor=#fefefe
| 287410 ||  || — || November 13, 2002 || Palomar || NEAT || — || align=right | 1.2 km || 
|-id=411 bgcolor=#E9E9E9
| 287411 ||  || — || November 6, 2002 || Haleakala || NEAT || — || align=right | 3.3 km || 
|-id=412 bgcolor=#E9E9E9
| 287412 ||  || — || November 1, 2002 || Socorro || LINEAR || — || align=right | 2.7 km || 
|-id=413 bgcolor=#E9E9E9
| 287413 ||  || — || November 12, 2002 || Palomar || NEAT || WIT || align=right | 1.3 km || 
|-id=414 bgcolor=#d6d6d6
| 287414 ||  || — || November 15, 2002 || Palomar || NEAT || — || align=right | 2.9 km || 
|-id=415 bgcolor=#E9E9E9
| 287415 ||  || — || November 14, 2002 || Palomar || NEAT || — || align=right | 1.2 km || 
|-id=416 bgcolor=#E9E9E9
| 287416 ||  || — || November 23, 2002 || Palomar || NEAT || — || align=right | 3.3 km || 
|-id=417 bgcolor=#E9E9E9
| 287417 ||  || — || November 24, 2002 || Wrightwood || J. W. Young || — || align=right | 2.9 km || 
|-id=418 bgcolor=#fefefe
| 287418 ||  || — || November 24, 2002 || Palomar || NEAT || — || align=right data-sort-value="0.99" | 990 m || 
|-id=419 bgcolor=#fefefe
| 287419 ||  || — || November 30, 2002 || Socorro || LINEAR || H || align=right data-sort-value="0.82" | 820 m || 
|-id=420 bgcolor=#E9E9E9
| 287420 ||  || — || November 25, 2002 || Palomar || S. F. Hönig || — || align=right | 1.8 km || 
|-id=421 bgcolor=#d6d6d6
| 287421 ||  || — || November 24, 2002 || Palomar || NEAT || — || align=right | 4.1 km || 
|-id=422 bgcolor=#d6d6d6
| 287422 ||  || — || November 24, 2002 || Palomar || NEAT || EOS || align=right | 2.5 km || 
|-id=423 bgcolor=#E9E9E9
| 287423 ||  || — || November 16, 2002 || Palomar || NEAT || — || align=right | 1.6 km || 
|-id=424 bgcolor=#E9E9E9
| 287424 ||  || — || November 24, 2002 || Palomar || NEAT || — || align=right | 2.7 km || 
|-id=425 bgcolor=#E9E9E9
| 287425 ||  || — || November 24, 2002 || Palomar || NEAT || — || align=right | 1.3 km || 
|-id=426 bgcolor=#fefefe
| 287426 ||  || — || November 24, 2002 || Palomar || NEAT || V || align=right data-sort-value="0.71" | 710 m || 
|-id=427 bgcolor=#E9E9E9
| 287427 ||  || — || November 24, 2002 || Palomar || NEAT || — || align=right | 3.0 km || 
|-id=428 bgcolor=#d6d6d6
| 287428 ||  || — || November 16, 2002 || Palomar || NEAT || — || align=right | 2.6 km || 
|-id=429 bgcolor=#E9E9E9
| 287429 ||  || — || November 22, 2002 || Palomar || NEAT || WIT || align=right | 1.3 km || 
|-id=430 bgcolor=#fefefe
| 287430 ||  || — || November 23, 2002 || Palomar || NEAT || — || align=right data-sort-value="0.97" | 970 m || 
|-id=431 bgcolor=#E9E9E9
| 287431 ||  || — || November 16, 2002 || Palomar || NEAT || HOF || align=right | 3.5 km || 
|-id=432 bgcolor=#d6d6d6
| 287432 ||  || — || November 24, 2002 || Palomar || NEAT || — || align=right | 2.3 km || 
|-id=433 bgcolor=#d6d6d6
| 287433 ||  || — || November 23, 2002 || Palomar || NEAT || TIR || align=right | 3.6 km || 
|-id=434 bgcolor=#fefefe
| 287434 ||  || — || November 22, 2002 || Palomar || NEAT || — || align=right data-sort-value="0.76" | 760 m || 
|-id=435 bgcolor=#E9E9E9
| 287435 ||  || — || December 1, 2002 || Socorro || LINEAR || — || align=right | 1.2 km || 
|-id=436 bgcolor=#fefefe
| 287436 ||  || — || December 2, 2002 || Emerald Lane || L. Ball || NYS || align=right data-sort-value="0.65" | 650 m || 
|-id=437 bgcolor=#d6d6d6
| 287437 ||  || — || December 1, 2002 || Socorro || LINEAR || — || align=right | 3.0 km || 
|-id=438 bgcolor=#fefefe
| 287438 ||  || — || December 3, 2002 || Palomar || NEAT || V || align=right | 1.0 km || 
|-id=439 bgcolor=#E9E9E9
| 287439 ||  || — || December 5, 2002 || Socorro || LINEAR || — || align=right | 2.3 km || 
|-id=440 bgcolor=#d6d6d6
| 287440 ||  || — || December 5, 2002 || Socorro || LINEAR || — || align=right | 5.1 km || 
|-id=441 bgcolor=#d6d6d6
| 287441 ||  || — || December 5, 2002 || Socorro || LINEAR || NAE || align=right | 6.0 km || 
|-id=442 bgcolor=#d6d6d6
| 287442 ||  || — || December 6, 2002 || Socorro || LINEAR || — || align=right | 4.4 km || 
|-id=443 bgcolor=#fefefe
| 287443 ||  || — || December 7, 2002 || Socorro || LINEAR || H || align=right | 1.1 km || 
|-id=444 bgcolor=#d6d6d6
| 287444 ||  || — || December 10, 2002 || Socorro || LINEAR || — || align=right | 3.2 km || 
|-id=445 bgcolor=#E9E9E9
| 287445 ||  || — || December 11, 2002 || Palomar || NEAT || — || align=right | 1.4 km || 
|-id=446 bgcolor=#d6d6d6
| 287446 ||  || — || December 11, 2002 || Socorro || LINEAR || TRP || align=right | 3.5 km || 
|-id=447 bgcolor=#fefefe
| 287447 ||  || — || December 11, 2002 || Socorro || LINEAR || — || align=right | 2.5 km || 
|-id=448 bgcolor=#fefefe
| 287448 ||  || — || December 11, 2002 || Socorro || LINEAR || — || align=right | 1.0 km || 
|-id=449 bgcolor=#E9E9E9
| 287449 ||  || — || December 12, 2002 || Palomar || NEAT || — || align=right | 4.3 km || 
|-id=450 bgcolor=#E9E9E9
| 287450 ||  || — || December 5, 2002 || Socorro || LINEAR || — || align=right | 2.9 km || 
|-id=451 bgcolor=#E9E9E9
| 287451 ||  || — || December 7, 2002 || Apache Point || SDSS || MRX || align=right | 1.6 km || 
|-id=452 bgcolor=#d6d6d6
| 287452 ||  || — || December 10, 2002 || Palomar || NEAT || — || align=right | 4.4 km || 
|-id=453 bgcolor=#E9E9E9
| 287453 ||  || — || December 10, 2002 || Palomar || NEAT || — || align=right | 1.2 km || 
|-id=454 bgcolor=#C2FFFF
| 287454 ||  || — || December 30, 2002 || Bohyunsan || Y.-B. Jeon, B.-C. Lee || L5ENM || align=right | 17 km || 
|-id=455 bgcolor=#E9E9E9
| 287455 ||  || — || December 31, 2002 || Socorro || LINEAR || — || align=right | 1.2 km || 
|-id=456 bgcolor=#E9E9E9
| 287456 ||  || — || December 31, 2002 || Kitt Peak || Spacewatch || — || align=right | 2.5 km || 
|-id=457 bgcolor=#E9E9E9
| 287457 ||  || — || December 31, 2002 || Socorro || LINEAR || — || align=right | 3.3 km || 
|-id=458 bgcolor=#E9E9E9
| 287458 ||  || — || December 31, 2002 || Socorro || LINEAR || — || align=right | 1.2 km || 
|-id=459 bgcolor=#E9E9E9
| 287459 ||  || — || December 31, 2002 || Socorro || LINEAR || — || align=right | 1.3 km || 
|-id=460 bgcolor=#E9E9E9
| 287460 ||  || — || December 27, 2002 || Palomar || NEAT || — || align=right | 2.4 km || 
|-id=461 bgcolor=#d6d6d6
| 287461 ||  || — || December 30, 2002 || Socorro || LINEAR || — || align=right | 6.4 km || 
|-id=462 bgcolor=#E9E9E9
| 287462 ||  || — || January 2, 2003 || Socorro || LINEAR || MAR || align=right | 1.2 km || 
|-id=463 bgcolor=#E9E9E9
| 287463 ||  || — || January 4, 2003 || Socorro || LINEAR || RAF || align=right | 1.6 km || 
|-id=464 bgcolor=#d6d6d6
| 287464 ||  || — || January 5, 2003 || Socorro || LINEAR || — || align=right | 5.3 km || 
|-id=465 bgcolor=#fefefe
| 287465 ||  || — || January 4, 2003 || Socorro || LINEAR || V || align=right data-sort-value="0.95" | 950 m || 
|-id=466 bgcolor=#E9E9E9
| 287466 ||  || — || January 4, 2003 || Socorro || LINEAR || — || align=right | 4.0 km || 
|-id=467 bgcolor=#E9E9E9
| 287467 ||  || — || January 7, 2003 || Socorro || LINEAR || — || align=right | 1.3 km || 
|-id=468 bgcolor=#fefefe
| 287468 ||  || — || January 7, 2003 || Socorro || LINEAR || — || align=right | 1.6 km || 
|-id=469 bgcolor=#d6d6d6
| 287469 ||  || — || January 7, 2003 || Socorro || LINEAR || LIX || align=right | 4.7 km || 
|-id=470 bgcolor=#fefefe
| 287470 ||  || — || January 7, 2003 || Socorro || LINEAR || — || align=right | 2.0 km || 
|-id=471 bgcolor=#d6d6d6
| 287471 ||  || — || January 5, 2003 || Socorro || LINEAR || — || align=right | 5.0 km || 
|-id=472 bgcolor=#E9E9E9
| 287472 ||  || — || January 5, 2003 || Socorro || LINEAR || — || align=right | 2.9 km || 
|-id=473 bgcolor=#d6d6d6
| 287473 ||  || — || January 8, 2003 || Socorro || LINEAR || — || align=right | 3.0 km || 
|-id=474 bgcolor=#fefefe
| 287474 ||  || — || January 8, 2003 || Socorro || LINEAR || NYS || align=right data-sort-value="0.97" | 970 m || 
|-id=475 bgcolor=#E9E9E9
| 287475 ||  || — || January 7, 2003 || Socorro || LINEAR || — || align=right | 2.3 km || 
|-id=476 bgcolor=#fefefe
| 287476 ||  || — || January 10, 2003 || Socorro || LINEAR || H || align=right data-sort-value="0.78" | 780 m || 
|-id=477 bgcolor=#d6d6d6
| 287477 ||  || — || January 11, 2003 || Kitt Peak || Spacewatch || — || align=right | 2.9 km || 
|-id=478 bgcolor=#d6d6d6
| 287478 ||  || — || January 10, 2003 || Kitt Peak || Spacewatch || — || align=right | 3.4 km || 
|-id=479 bgcolor=#E9E9E9
| 287479 ||  || — || January 11, 2003 || Socorro || LINEAR || HNS || align=right | 1.8 km || 
|-id=480 bgcolor=#d6d6d6
| 287480 ||  || — || January 11, 2003 || Goodricke-Pigott || R. A. Tucker || EUP || align=right | 5.4 km || 
|-id=481 bgcolor=#E9E9E9
| 287481 ||  || — || January 7, 2003 || Socorro || LINEAR || — || align=right | 1.6 km || 
|-id=482 bgcolor=#d6d6d6
| 287482 ||  || — || January 11, 2003 || Kitt Peak || Spacewatch || — || align=right | 3.1 km || 
|-id=483 bgcolor=#d6d6d6
| 287483 ||  || — || January 24, 2003 || La Silla || A. Boattini, H. Scholl || — || align=right | 3.9 km || 
|-id=484 bgcolor=#d6d6d6
| 287484 ||  || — || January 26, 2003 || Anderson Mesa || LONEOS || — || align=right | 4.9 km || 
|-id=485 bgcolor=#E9E9E9
| 287485 ||  || — || January 26, 2003 || Anderson Mesa || LONEOS || — || align=right | 2.2 km || 
|-id=486 bgcolor=#E9E9E9
| 287486 ||  || — || January 26, 2003 || Anderson Mesa || LONEOS || — || align=right | 2.3 km || 
|-id=487 bgcolor=#d6d6d6
| 287487 ||  || — || January 26, 2003 || Haleakala || NEAT || — || align=right | 4.7 km || 
|-id=488 bgcolor=#fefefe
| 287488 ||  || — || January 26, 2003 || Haleakala || NEAT || — || align=right | 1.3 km || 
|-id=489 bgcolor=#E9E9E9
| 287489 ||  || — || January 27, 2003 || Socorro || LINEAR || — || align=right | 3.3 km || 
|-id=490 bgcolor=#d6d6d6
| 287490 ||  || — || January 26, 2003 || Anderson Mesa || LONEOS || — || align=right | 3.9 km || 
|-id=491 bgcolor=#fefefe
| 287491 ||  || — || January 26, 2003 || Anderson Mesa || LONEOS || FLO || align=right data-sort-value="0.83" | 830 m || 
|-id=492 bgcolor=#d6d6d6
| 287492 ||  || — || January 25, 2003 || Palomar || NEAT || MEL || align=right | 4.4 km || 
|-id=493 bgcolor=#d6d6d6
| 287493 ||  || — || January 26, 2003 || Haleakala || NEAT || — || align=right | 3.9 km || 
|-id=494 bgcolor=#fefefe
| 287494 ||  || — || January 26, 2003 || Haleakala || NEAT || — || align=right data-sort-value="0.91" | 910 m || 
|-id=495 bgcolor=#d6d6d6
| 287495 ||  || — || January 27, 2003 || Socorro || LINEAR || TIR || align=right | 3.1 km || 
|-id=496 bgcolor=#fefefe
| 287496 ||  || — || January 27, 2003 || Socorro || LINEAR || — || align=right data-sort-value="0.93" | 930 m || 
|-id=497 bgcolor=#fefefe
| 287497 ||  || — || January 27, 2003 || Palomar || NEAT || — || align=right | 1.6 km || 
|-id=498 bgcolor=#E9E9E9
| 287498 ||  || — || January 27, 2003 || Palomar || NEAT || — || align=right | 2.9 km || 
|-id=499 bgcolor=#d6d6d6
| 287499 ||  || — || January 27, 2003 || Anderson Mesa || LONEOS || — || align=right | 5.7 km || 
|-id=500 bgcolor=#fefefe
| 287500 ||  || — || January 27, 2003 || Anderson Mesa || LONEOS || — || align=right data-sort-value="0.95" | 950 m || 
|}

287501–287600 

|-bgcolor=#d6d6d6
| 287501 ||  || — || January 27, 2003 || Socorro || LINEAR || — || align=right | 3.5 km || 
|-id=502 bgcolor=#d6d6d6
| 287502 ||  || — || January 27, 2003 || Socorro || LINEAR || — || align=right | 4.6 km || 
|-id=503 bgcolor=#E9E9E9
| 287503 ||  || — || January 27, 2003 || Kitt Peak || Spacewatch || — || align=right | 2.2 km || 
|-id=504 bgcolor=#d6d6d6
| 287504 ||  || — || January 27, 2003 || Anderson Mesa || LONEOS || URS || align=right | 4.6 km || 
|-id=505 bgcolor=#E9E9E9
| 287505 ||  || — || January 27, 2003 || Palomar || NEAT || — || align=right | 2.6 km || 
|-id=506 bgcolor=#E9E9E9
| 287506 ||  || — || January 27, 2003 || Anderson Mesa || LONEOS || — || align=right | 3.3 km || 
|-id=507 bgcolor=#E9E9E9
| 287507 ||  || — || January 27, 2003 || Socorro || LINEAR || DOR || align=right | 3.4 km || 
|-id=508 bgcolor=#E9E9E9
| 287508 ||  || — || January 28, 2003 || Palomar || NEAT || — || align=right | 1.4 km || 
|-id=509 bgcolor=#E9E9E9
| 287509 ||  || — || January 28, 2003 || Kitt Peak || Spacewatch || WAT || align=right | 1.9 km || 
|-id=510 bgcolor=#d6d6d6
| 287510 ||  || — || January 28, 2003 || Socorro || LINEAR || — || align=right | 6.6 km || 
|-id=511 bgcolor=#E9E9E9
| 287511 ||  || — || January 30, 2003 || Anderson Mesa || LONEOS || — || align=right | 1.2 km || 
|-id=512 bgcolor=#fefefe
| 287512 ||  || — || January 30, 2003 || Palomar || NEAT || — || align=right | 1.3 km || 
|-id=513 bgcolor=#E9E9E9
| 287513 ||  || — || January 28, 2003 || Palomar || NEAT || — || align=right | 2.4 km || 
|-id=514 bgcolor=#fefefe
| 287514 ||  || — || January 28, 2003 || Haleakala || NEAT || — || align=right | 1.2 km || 
|-id=515 bgcolor=#d6d6d6
| 287515 ||  || — || January 29, 2003 || Palomar || NEAT || — || align=right | 5.2 km || 
|-id=516 bgcolor=#d6d6d6
| 287516 ||  || — || January 29, 2003 || Palomar || NEAT || — || align=right | 3.8 km || 
|-id=517 bgcolor=#fefefe
| 287517 ||  || — || January 30, 2003 || Haleakala || NEAT || — || align=right | 1.2 km || 
|-id=518 bgcolor=#E9E9E9
| 287518 ||  || — || January 31, 2003 || Anderson Mesa || LONEOS || — || align=right | 2.2 km || 
|-id=519 bgcolor=#E9E9E9
| 287519 ||  || — || January 25, 2003 || Palomar || NEAT || — || align=right | 2.4 km || 
|-id=520 bgcolor=#d6d6d6
| 287520 ||  || — || February 1, 2003 || Socorro || LINEAR || — || align=right | 5.5 km || 
|-id=521 bgcolor=#d6d6d6
| 287521 ||  || — || February 1, 2003 || Haleakala || NEAT || — || align=right | 5.5 km || 
|-id=522 bgcolor=#d6d6d6
| 287522 ||  || — || February 3, 2003 || Palomar || NEAT || EOS || align=right | 4.6 km || 
|-id=523 bgcolor=#fefefe
| 287523 ||  || — || February 3, 2003 || Anderson Mesa || LONEOS || H || align=right data-sort-value="0.82" | 820 m || 
|-id=524 bgcolor=#E9E9E9
| 287524 ||  || — || February 2, 2003 || Anderson Mesa || LONEOS || — || align=right | 2.5 km || 
|-id=525 bgcolor=#E9E9E9
| 287525 ||  || — || January 31, 2003 || Socorro || LINEAR || — || align=right | 1.6 km || 
|-id=526 bgcolor=#E9E9E9
| 287526 ||  || — || February 7, 2003 || Kitt Peak || Spacewatch || — || align=right | 3.0 km || 
|-id=527 bgcolor=#fefefe
| 287527 ||  || — || February 21, 2003 || Palomar || NEAT || — || align=right data-sort-value="0.91" | 910 m || 
|-id=528 bgcolor=#d6d6d6
| 287528 ||  || — || February 21, 2003 || Palomar || NEAT || — || align=right | 4.7 km || 
|-id=529 bgcolor=#E9E9E9
| 287529 ||  || — || February 21, 2003 || Palomar || NEAT || — || align=right | 3.3 km || 
|-id=530 bgcolor=#E9E9E9
| 287530 ||  || — || February 20, 2003 || Haleakala || NEAT || — || align=right | 2.0 km || 
|-id=531 bgcolor=#E9E9E9
| 287531 ||  || — || February 23, 2003 || Campo Imperatore || CINEOS || — || align=right | 1.3 km || 
|-id=532 bgcolor=#E9E9E9
| 287532 ||  || — || February 22, 2003 || Palomar || NEAT || MRX || align=right | 1.3 km || 
|-id=533 bgcolor=#E9E9E9
| 287533 ||  || — || February 22, 2003 || Palomar || NEAT || — || align=right | 1.7 km || 
|-id=534 bgcolor=#d6d6d6
| 287534 ||  || — || February 26, 2003 || Campo Imperatore || CINEOS || EOS || align=right | 2.6 km || 
|-id=535 bgcolor=#d6d6d6
| 287535 ||  || — || February 24, 2003 || Haleakala || NEAT || — || align=right | 5.3 km || 
|-id=536 bgcolor=#fefefe
| 287536 ||  || — || February 22, 2003 || Palomar || NEAT || — || align=right data-sort-value="0.79" | 790 m || 
|-id=537 bgcolor=#fefefe
| 287537 ||  || — || March 5, 2003 || Socorro || LINEAR || MAS || align=right data-sort-value="0.90" | 900 m || 
|-id=538 bgcolor=#E9E9E9
| 287538 ||  || — || March 6, 2003 || Anderson Mesa || LONEOS || — || align=right | 2.0 km || 
|-id=539 bgcolor=#d6d6d6
| 287539 ||  || — || March 6, 2003 || Socorro || LINEAR || EUP || align=right | 6.4 km || 
|-id=540 bgcolor=#d6d6d6
| 287540 ||  || — || March 6, 2003 || Anderson Mesa || LONEOS || — || align=right | 3.5 km || 
|-id=541 bgcolor=#E9E9E9
| 287541 ||  || — || March 6, 2003 || Anderson Mesa || LONEOS || — || align=right | 2.7 km || 
|-id=542 bgcolor=#fefefe
| 287542 ||  || — || March 6, 2003 || Anderson Mesa || LONEOS || FLO || align=right | 1.4 km || 
|-id=543 bgcolor=#E9E9E9
| 287543 ||  || — || March 6, 2003 || Socorro || LINEAR || — || align=right | 1.1 km || 
|-id=544 bgcolor=#E9E9E9
| 287544 ||  || — || March 6, 2003 || Socorro || LINEAR || — || align=right | 2.2 km || 
|-id=545 bgcolor=#fefefe
| 287545 ||  || — || March 6, 2003 || Palomar || NEAT || V || align=right data-sort-value="0.96" | 960 m || 
|-id=546 bgcolor=#d6d6d6
| 287546 ||  || — || March 7, 2003 || Anderson Mesa || LONEOS || — || align=right | 3.1 km || 
|-id=547 bgcolor=#fefefe
| 287547 ||  || — || March 9, 2003 || Socorro || LINEAR || V || align=right data-sort-value="0.80" | 800 m || 
|-id=548 bgcolor=#d6d6d6
| 287548 ||  || — || March 7, 2003 || Socorro || LINEAR || — || align=right | 3.7 km || 
|-id=549 bgcolor=#d6d6d6
| 287549 ||  || — || March 7, 2003 || Socorro || LINEAR || — || align=right | 5.2 km || 
|-id=550 bgcolor=#fefefe
| 287550 ||  || — || March 7, 2003 || Socorro || LINEAR || — || align=right data-sort-value="0.75" | 750 m || 
|-id=551 bgcolor=#fefefe
| 287551 ||  || — || March 10, 2003 || Palomar || NEAT || FLO || align=right data-sort-value="0.75" | 750 m || 
|-id=552 bgcolor=#d6d6d6
| 287552 ||  || — || March 11, 2003 || Palomar || NEAT || — || align=right | 5.5 km || 
|-id=553 bgcolor=#d6d6d6
| 287553 ||  || — || March 9, 2003 || Socorro || LINEAR || Tj (2.89) || align=right | 3.9 km || 
|-id=554 bgcolor=#d6d6d6
| 287554 ||  || — || March 9, 2003 || Socorro || LINEAR || EUP || align=right | 6.7 km || 
|-id=555 bgcolor=#E9E9E9
| 287555 ||  || — || March 22, 2003 || Palomar || NEAT || — || align=right | 1.3 km || 
|-id=556 bgcolor=#d6d6d6
| 287556 ||  || — || March 24, 2003 || Palomar || NEAT || EUP || align=right | 6.4 km || 
|-id=557 bgcolor=#fefefe
| 287557 ||  || — || March 28, 2003 || Piszkéstető || K. Sárneczky || FLO || align=right data-sort-value="0.99" | 990 m || 
|-id=558 bgcolor=#E9E9E9
| 287558 ||  || — || March 23, 2003 || Kitt Peak || Spacewatch || — || align=right | 1.8 km || 
|-id=559 bgcolor=#d6d6d6
| 287559 ||  || — || March 23, 2003 || Kitt Peak || Spacewatch || — || align=right | 7.0 km || 
|-id=560 bgcolor=#E9E9E9
| 287560 ||  || — || March 24, 2003 || Kitt Peak || Spacewatch || MRX || align=right | 1.0 km || 
|-id=561 bgcolor=#d6d6d6
| 287561 ||  || — || March 24, 2003 || Kitt Peak || Spacewatch || — || align=right | 2.5 km || 
|-id=562 bgcolor=#fefefe
| 287562 ||  || — || March 24, 2003 || Kitt Peak || Spacewatch || FLO || align=right data-sort-value="0.82" | 820 m || 
|-id=563 bgcolor=#E9E9E9
| 287563 ||  || — || March 25, 2003 || Palomar || NEAT || — || align=right | 2.5 km || 
|-id=564 bgcolor=#fefefe
| 287564 ||  || — || March 25, 2003 || Kitt Peak || Spacewatch || V || align=right data-sort-value="0.60" | 600 m || 
|-id=565 bgcolor=#fefefe
| 287565 ||  || — || March 25, 2003 || Kitt Peak || Spacewatch || — || align=right data-sort-value="0.83" | 830 m || 
|-id=566 bgcolor=#d6d6d6
| 287566 ||  || — || March 25, 2003 || Catalina || CSS || — || align=right | 3.9 km || 
|-id=567 bgcolor=#d6d6d6
| 287567 ||  || — || March 23, 2003 || Kitt Peak || Spacewatch || — || align=right | 3.8 km || 
|-id=568 bgcolor=#fefefe
| 287568 ||  || — || March 24, 2003 || Kitt Peak || Spacewatch || MAS || align=right data-sort-value="0.82" | 820 m || 
|-id=569 bgcolor=#fefefe
| 287569 ||  || — || March 24, 2003 || Kitt Peak || Spacewatch || NYS || align=right data-sort-value="0.72" | 720 m || 
|-id=570 bgcolor=#d6d6d6
| 287570 ||  || — || March 24, 2003 || Kitt Peak || Spacewatch || EMA || align=right | 3.5 km || 
|-id=571 bgcolor=#d6d6d6
| 287571 ||  || — || March 24, 2003 || Kitt Peak || Spacewatch || EOS || align=right | 2.3 km || 
|-id=572 bgcolor=#fefefe
| 287572 ||  || — || March 24, 2003 || Kitt Peak || Spacewatch || — || align=right data-sort-value="0.82" | 820 m || 
|-id=573 bgcolor=#d6d6d6
| 287573 ||  || — || March 23, 2003 || Kitt Peak || Spacewatch || — || align=right | 4.0 km || 
|-id=574 bgcolor=#C2FFFF
| 287574 ||  || — || March 23, 2003 || Kitt Peak || Spacewatch || L4 || align=right | 10 km || 
|-id=575 bgcolor=#E9E9E9
| 287575 ||  || — || March 23, 2003 || Kitt Peak || Spacewatch || — || align=right | 2.8 km || 
|-id=576 bgcolor=#E9E9E9
| 287576 ||  || — || March 23, 2003 || Kitt Peak || Spacewatch || — || align=right | 3.4 km || 
|-id=577 bgcolor=#C2FFFF
| 287577 ||  || — || March 31, 2003 || Wrightwood || J. W. Young || L4ERY || align=right | 9.6 km || 
|-id=578 bgcolor=#E9E9E9
| 287578 ||  || — || March 24, 2003 || Kitt Peak || Spacewatch || — || align=right | 2.5 km || 
|-id=579 bgcolor=#E9E9E9
| 287579 ||  || — || March 26, 2003 || Palomar || NEAT || EUN || align=right | 1.5 km || 
|-id=580 bgcolor=#fefefe
| 287580 ||  || — || March 26, 2003 || Palomar || NEAT || NYS || align=right data-sort-value="0.77" | 770 m || 
|-id=581 bgcolor=#fefefe
| 287581 ||  || — || March 26, 2003 || Palomar || NEAT || ERI || align=right | 2.1 km || 
|-id=582 bgcolor=#E9E9E9
| 287582 ||  || — || March 26, 2003 || Palomar || NEAT || — || align=right | 2.1 km || 
|-id=583 bgcolor=#fefefe
| 287583 ||  || — || March 28, 2003 || Kitt Peak || Spacewatch || NYS || align=right data-sort-value="0.88" | 880 m || 
|-id=584 bgcolor=#fefefe
| 287584 ||  || — || March 29, 2003 || Anderson Mesa || LONEOS || — || align=right | 1.2 km || 
|-id=585 bgcolor=#E9E9E9
| 287585 ||  || — || March 29, 2003 || Anderson Mesa || LONEOS || ADE || align=right | 2.7 km || 
|-id=586 bgcolor=#fefefe
| 287586 ||  || — || March 29, 2003 || Anderson Mesa || LONEOS || NYS || align=right data-sort-value="0.76" | 760 m || 
|-id=587 bgcolor=#fefefe
| 287587 ||  || — || March 31, 2003 || Socorro || LINEAR || KLI || align=right | 1.8 km || 
|-id=588 bgcolor=#E9E9E9
| 287588 ||  || — || March 26, 2003 || Palomar || NEAT || — || align=right | 1.6 km || 
|-id=589 bgcolor=#fefefe
| 287589 ||  || — || March 26, 2003 || Palomar || NEAT || — || align=right | 1.2 km || 
|-id=590 bgcolor=#E9E9E9
| 287590 ||  || — || March 30, 2003 || Socorro || LINEAR || — || align=right | 2.9 km || 
|-id=591 bgcolor=#fefefe
| 287591 ||  || — || March 31, 2003 || Anderson Mesa || LONEOS || — || align=right data-sort-value="0.94" | 940 m || 
|-id=592 bgcolor=#fefefe
| 287592 ||  || — || March 24, 2003 || Kitt Peak || Spacewatch || V || align=right data-sort-value="0.87" | 870 m || 
|-id=593 bgcolor=#fefefe
| 287593 ||  || — || March 26, 2003 || Anderson Mesa || LONEOS || — || align=right | 1.2 km || 
|-id=594 bgcolor=#d6d6d6
| 287594 ||  || — || March 31, 2003 || Cerro Tololo || DLS || BRA || align=right | 2.1 km || 
|-id=595 bgcolor=#d6d6d6
| 287595 ||  || — || March 26, 2003 || Anderson Mesa || LONEOS || — || align=right | 4.3 km || 
|-id=596 bgcolor=#fefefe
| 287596 ||  || — || March 27, 2003 || Kitt Peak || Spacewatch || — || align=right data-sort-value="0.87" | 870 m || 
|-id=597 bgcolor=#E9E9E9
| 287597 ||  || — || March 31, 2003 || Kitt Peak || Spacewatch || GER || align=right | 2.0 km || 
|-id=598 bgcolor=#E9E9E9
| 287598 ||  || — || March 24, 2003 || Haleakala || NEAT || — || align=right | 1.8 km || 
|-id=599 bgcolor=#E9E9E9
| 287599 ||  || — || March 24, 2003 || Kitt Peak || Spacewatch || — || align=right | 1.9 km || 
|-id=600 bgcolor=#C2FFFF
| 287600 ||  || — || March 26, 2003 || Kitt Peak || Spacewatch || L4 || align=right | 9.8 km || 
|}

287601–287700 

|-bgcolor=#fefefe
| 287601 ||  || — || April 1, 2003 || Socorro || LINEAR || H || align=right data-sort-value="0.64" | 640 m || 
|-id=602 bgcolor=#fefefe
| 287602 ||  || — || April 1, 2003 || Socorro || LINEAR || — || align=right data-sort-value="0.89" | 890 m || 
|-id=603 bgcolor=#fefefe
| 287603 ||  || — || April 3, 2003 || Anderson Mesa || LONEOS || — || align=right | 1.0 km || 
|-id=604 bgcolor=#fefefe
| 287604 ||  || — || April 7, 2003 || Kitt Peak || Spacewatch || — || align=right data-sort-value="0.86" | 860 m || 
|-id=605 bgcolor=#E9E9E9
| 287605 ||  || — || April 7, 2003 || Socorro || LINEAR || — || align=right | 2.2 km || 
|-id=606 bgcolor=#E9E9E9
| 287606 ||  || — || April 5, 2003 || Anderson Mesa || LONEOS || EUN || align=right | 2.0 km || 
|-id=607 bgcolor=#E9E9E9
| 287607 ||  || — || April 8, 2003 || Kitt Peak || Spacewatch || AGN || align=right | 1.4 km || 
|-id=608 bgcolor=#d6d6d6
| 287608 ||  || — || April 8, 2003 || Kitt Peak || Spacewatch || — || align=right | 5.2 km || 
|-id=609 bgcolor=#fefefe
| 287609 ||  || — || April 9, 2003 || Palomar || NEAT || NYS || align=right data-sort-value="0.74" | 740 m || 
|-id=610 bgcolor=#E9E9E9
| 287610 ||  || — || April 7, 2003 || Kitt Peak || Spacewatch || — || align=right | 2.1 km || 
|-id=611 bgcolor=#d6d6d6
| 287611 ||  || — || April 9, 2003 || Palomar || NEAT || EOS || align=right | 4.1 km || 
|-id=612 bgcolor=#fefefe
| 287612 ||  || — || April 3, 2003 || Anderson Mesa || LONEOS || V || align=right data-sort-value="0.94" | 940 m || 
|-id=613 bgcolor=#d6d6d6
| 287613 ||  || — || April 1, 2003 || Anderson Mesa || LONEOS || — || align=right | 5.0 km || 
|-id=614 bgcolor=#fefefe
| 287614 ||  || — || April 5, 2003 || Kitt Peak || Spacewatch || — || align=right | 1.5 km || 
|-id=615 bgcolor=#fefefe
| 287615 ||  || — || April 21, 2003 || Catalina || CSS || — || align=right data-sort-value="0.90" | 900 m || 
|-id=616 bgcolor=#fefefe
| 287616 ||  || — || April 24, 2003 || Anderson Mesa || LONEOS || V || align=right data-sort-value="0.85" | 850 m || 
|-id=617 bgcolor=#fefefe
| 287617 ||  || — || April 24, 2003 || Anderson Mesa || LONEOS || V || align=right data-sort-value="0.76" | 760 m || 
|-id=618 bgcolor=#d6d6d6
| 287618 ||  || — || April 24, 2003 || Kitt Peak || Spacewatch || — || align=right | 4.2 km || 
|-id=619 bgcolor=#fefefe
| 287619 ||  || — || April 24, 2003 || Kitt Peak || Spacewatch || — || align=right data-sort-value="0.90" | 900 m || 
|-id=620 bgcolor=#d6d6d6
| 287620 ||  || — || April 25, 2003 || Campo Imperatore || CINEOS || — || align=right | 4.8 km || 
|-id=621 bgcolor=#E9E9E9
| 287621 ||  || — || April 26, 2003 || Kitt Peak || Spacewatch || — || align=right | 2.3 km || 
|-id=622 bgcolor=#fefefe
| 287622 ||  || — || April 28, 2003 || Emerald Lane || L. Ball || V || align=right data-sort-value="0.85" | 850 m || 
|-id=623 bgcolor=#d6d6d6
| 287623 ||  || — || April 24, 2003 || Anderson Mesa || LONEOS || TRP || align=right | 2.4 km || 
|-id=624 bgcolor=#E9E9E9
| 287624 ||  || — || April 24, 2003 || Anderson Mesa || LONEOS || — || align=right | 2.8 km || 
|-id=625 bgcolor=#fefefe
| 287625 ||  || — || April 27, 2003 || Anderson Mesa || LONEOS || — || align=right data-sort-value="0.86" | 860 m || 
|-id=626 bgcolor=#fefefe
| 287626 ||  || — || April 28, 2003 || Anderson Mesa || LONEOS || — || align=right | 1.0 km || 
|-id=627 bgcolor=#d6d6d6
| 287627 ||  || — || April 26, 2003 || Kitt Peak || Spacewatch || — || align=right | 5.1 km || 
|-id=628 bgcolor=#E9E9E9
| 287628 ||  || — || April 28, 2003 || Kitt Peak || Spacewatch || — || align=right | 2.1 km || 
|-id=629 bgcolor=#fefefe
| 287629 ||  || — || April 29, 2003 || Kitt Peak || Spacewatch || NYS || align=right data-sort-value="0.83" | 830 m || 
|-id=630 bgcolor=#E9E9E9
| 287630 ||  || — || April 29, 2003 || Kitt Peak || Spacewatch || DOR || align=right | 3.0 km || 
|-id=631 bgcolor=#E9E9E9
| 287631 ||  || — || April 26, 2003 || Kitt Peak || Spacewatch || — || align=right | 2.2 km || 
|-id=632 bgcolor=#E9E9E9
| 287632 ||  || — || April 26, 2003 || Kitt Peak || Spacewatch || MRX || align=right | 1.2 km || 
|-id=633 bgcolor=#fefefe
| 287633 ||  || — || April 26, 2003 || Kitt Peak || Spacewatch || — || align=right data-sort-value="0.91" | 910 m || 
|-id=634 bgcolor=#d6d6d6
| 287634 ||  || — || April 29, 2003 || Anderson Mesa || LONEOS || LIX || align=right | 5.3 km || 
|-id=635 bgcolor=#d6d6d6
| 287635 ||  || — || April 29, 2003 || Socorro || LINEAR || — || align=right | 5.5 km || 
|-id=636 bgcolor=#fefefe
| 287636 ||  || — || April 24, 2003 || Campo Imperatore || CINEOS || NYS || align=right | 1.0 km || 
|-id=637 bgcolor=#fefefe
| 287637 ||  || — || April 25, 2003 || Kitt Peak || Spacewatch || MAS || align=right data-sort-value="0.86" | 860 m || 
|-id=638 bgcolor=#d6d6d6
| 287638 ||  || — || April 25, 2003 || Kitt Peak || Spacewatch || — || align=right | 5.4 km || 
|-id=639 bgcolor=#fefefe
| 287639 ||  || — || May 1, 2003 || Kitt Peak || Spacewatch || FLO || align=right data-sort-value="0.62" | 620 m || 
|-id=640 bgcolor=#d6d6d6
| 287640 ||  || — || May 1, 2003 || Kitt Peak || Spacewatch || — || align=right | 4.7 km || 
|-id=641 bgcolor=#E9E9E9
| 287641 ||  || — || May 3, 2003 || Kleť || Kleť Obs. || — || align=right | 3.5 km || 
|-id=642 bgcolor=#fefefe
| 287642 ||  || — || May 1, 2003 || Kitt Peak || Spacewatch || — || align=right | 1.2 km || 
|-id=643 bgcolor=#d6d6d6
| 287643 ||  || — || May 9, 2003 || Haleakala || NEAT || EUP || align=right | 6.4 km || 
|-id=644 bgcolor=#fefefe
| 287644 ||  || — || May 2, 2003 || Socorro || LINEAR || — || align=right | 1.2 km || 
|-id=645 bgcolor=#fefefe
| 287645 ||  || — || May 25, 2003 || Kitt Peak || Spacewatch || NYS || align=right | 1.5 km || 
|-id=646 bgcolor=#FA8072
| 287646 ||  || — || May 23, 2003 || Kitt Peak || Spacewatch || — || align=right data-sort-value="0.74" | 740 m || 
|-id=647 bgcolor=#E9E9E9
| 287647 ||  || — || May 25, 2003 || Kitt Peak || Spacewatch || — || align=right | 2.0 km || 
|-id=648 bgcolor=#fefefe
| 287648 ||  || — || May 22, 2003 || Kitt Peak || Spacewatch || H || align=right data-sort-value="0.84" | 840 m || 
|-id=649 bgcolor=#d6d6d6
| 287649 ||  || — || May 25, 2003 || Kitt Peak || Spacewatch || — || align=right | 3.7 km || 
|-id=650 bgcolor=#fefefe
| 287650 ||  || — || May 26, 2003 || Haleakala || NEAT || — || align=right | 1.4 km || 
|-id=651 bgcolor=#fefefe
| 287651 ||  || — || May 27, 2003 || Haleakala || NEAT || — || align=right | 3.1 km || 
|-id=652 bgcolor=#fefefe
| 287652 ||  || — || May 30, 2003 || Socorro || LINEAR || — || align=right | 1.4 km || 
|-id=653 bgcolor=#fefefe
| 287653 ||  || — || May 25, 2003 || Nogales || Tenagra II Obs. || — || align=right | 2.6 km || 
|-id=654 bgcolor=#fefefe
| 287654 ||  || — || June 2, 2003 || Nogales || Tenagra II Obs. || NYS || align=right data-sort-value="0.69" | 690 m || 
|-id=655 bgcolor=#fefefe
| 287655 ||  || — || June 25, 2003 || Nogales || M. Schwartz, P. R. Holvorcem || — || align=right | 1.0 km || 
|-id=656 bgcolor=#d6d6d6
| 287656 ||  || — || June 23, 2003 || Nogales || M. Schwartz, P. R. Holvorcem || — || align=right | 5.2 km || 
|-id=657 bgcolor=#fefefe
| 287657 ||  || — || June 26, 2003 || Socorro || LINEAR || — || align=right | 1.3 km || 
|-id=658 bgcolor=#d6d6d6
| 287658 ||  || — || June 28, 2003 || Socorro || LINEAR || — || align=right | 4.0 km || 
|-id=659 bgcolor=#E9E9E9
| 287659 ||  || — || June 28, 2003 || Reedy Creek || J. Broughton || — || align=right | 4.6 km || 
|-id=660 bgcolor=#fefefe
| 287660 ||  || — || July 2, 2003 || Haleakala || NEAT || — || align=right | 1.3 km || 
|-id=661 bgcolor=#d6d6d6
| 287661 ||  || — || July 4, 2003 || Reedy Creek || J. Broughton || — || align=right | 3.7 km || 
|-id=662 bgcolor=#FA8072
| 287662 ||  || — || July 7, 2003 || Reedy Creek || J. Broughton || — || align=right data-sort-value="0.96" | 960 m || 
|-id=663 bgcolor=#d6d6d6
| 287663 ||  || — || July 3, 2003 || Kitt Peak || Spacewatch || — || align=right | 2.8 km || 
|-id=664 bgcolor=#E9E9E9
| 287664 ||  || — || July 3, 2003 || Kitt Peak || Spacewatch || EUN || align=right | 1.5 km || 
|-id=665 bgcolor=#fefefe
| 287665 ||  || — || July 22, 2003 || Haleakala || NEAT || — || align=right data-sort-value="0.95" | 950 m || 
|-id=666 bgcolor=#fefefe
| 287666 ||  || — || July 22, 2003 || Haleakala || NEAT || — || align=right | 1.1 km || 
|-id=667 bgcolor=#fefefe
| 287667 ||  || — || July 26, 2003 || Reedy Creek || J. Broughton || — || align=right data-sort-value="0.84" | 840 m || 
|-id=668 bgcolor=#fefefe
| 287668 ||  || — || July 26, 2003 || Reedy Creek || J. Broughton || NYS || align=right data-sort-value="0.96" | 960 m || 
|-id=669 bgcolor=#fefefe
| 287669 ||  || — || July 23, 2003 || Palomar || NEAT || — || align=right | 1.2 km || 
|-id=670 bgcolor=#d6d6d6
| 287670 ||  || — || July 31, 2003 || Reedy Creek || J. Broughton || — || align=right | 4.7 km || 
|-id=671 bgcolor=#fefefe
| 287671 ||  || — || July 30, 2003 || Campo Imperatore || CINEOS || NYS || align=right data-sort-value="0.87" | 870 m || 
|-id=672 bgcolor=#fefefe
| 287672 ||  || — || July 24, 2003 || Palomar || NEAT || MAS || align=right data-sort-value="0.98" | 980 m || 
|-id=673 bgcolor=#fefefe
| 287673 ||  || — || August 1, 2003 || Haleakala || NEAT || — || align=right data-sort-value="0.93" | 930 m || 
|-id=674 bgcolor=#d6d6d6
| 287674 ||  || — || August 1, 2003 || Socorro || LINEAR || TIR || align=right | 3.0 km || 
|-id=675 bgcolor=#E9E9E9
| 287675 ||  || — || August 19, 2003 || Campo Imperatore || CINEOS || — || align=right | 1.2 km || 
|-id=676 bgcolor=#d6d6d6
| 287676 ||  || — || August 19, 2003 || Campo Imperatore || CINEOS || EOS || align=right | 5.0 km || 
|-id=677 bgcolor=#fefefe
| 287677 ||  || — || August 18, 2003 || Haleakala || NEAT || FLO || align=right | 1.2 km || 
|-id=678 bgcolor=#E9E9E9
| 287678 ||  || — || August 20, 2003 || Campo Imperatore || CINEOS || — || align=right | 1.9 km || 
|-id=679 bgcolor=#fefefe
| 287679 ||  || — || August 20, 2003 || Campo Imperatore || CINEOS || — || align=right data-sort-value="0.81" | 810 m || 
|-id=680 bgcolor=#E9E9E9
| 287680 ||  || — || August 20, 2003 || Palomar || NEAT || — || align=right | 3.3 km || 
|-id=681 bgcolor=#d6d6d6
| 287681 ||  || — || August 20, 2003 || Palomar || NEAT || — || align=right | 3.8 km || 
|-id=682 bgcolor=#d6d6d6
| 287682 ||  || — || August 20, 2003 || Palomar || NEAT || — || align=right | 4.4 km || 
|-id=683 bgcolor=#d6d6d6
| 287683 ||  || — || August 21, 2003 || Campo Imperatore || CINEOS || — || align=right | 3.9 km || 
|-id=684 bgcolor=#fefefe
| 287684 ||  || — || August 22, 2003 || Palomar || NEAT || KLI || align=right | 1.9 km || 
|-id=685 bgcolor=#fefefe
| 287685 ||  || — || August 22, 2003 || Palomar || NEAT || — || align=right data-sort-value="0.91" | 910 m || 
|-id=686 bgcolor=#E9E9E9
| 287686 ||  || — || August 22, 2003 || Socorro || LINEAR || — || align=right | 1.5 km || 
|-id=687 bgcolor=#fefefe
| 287687 ||  || — || August 22, 2003 || Palomar || NEAT || — || align=right data-sort-value="0.94" | 940 m || 
|-id=688 bgcolor=#fefefe
| 287688 ||  || — || August 22, 2003 || Palomar || NEAT || V || align=right data-sort-value="0.95" | 950 m || 
|-id=689 bgcolor=#E9E9E9
| 287689 ||  || — || August 22, 2003 || Palomar || NEAT || — || align=right | 2.0 km || 
|-id=690 bgcolor=#fefefe
| 287690 ||  || — || August 20, 2003 || Palomar || NEAT || V || align=right | 1.0 km || 
|-id=691 bgcolor=#d6d6d6
| 287691 ||  || — || August 20, 2003 || Palomar || NEAT || — || align=right | 5.4 km || 
|-id=692 bgcolor=#E9E9E9
| 287692 ||  || — || August 23, 2003 || Kleť || Kleť Obs. || EUN || align=right | 1.7 km || 
|-id=693 bgcolor=#fefefe
| 287693 Hugonnaivilma ||  ||  || August 24, 2003 || Piszkéstető || K. Sárneczky, B. Sipőcz || NYS || align=right data-sort-value="0.68" | 680 m || 
|-id=694 bgcolor=#d6d6d6
| 287694 ||  || — || August 20, 2003 || Palomar || NEAT || EUP || align=right | 4.8 km || 
|-id=695 bgcolor=#fefefe
| 287695 ||  || — || August 21, 2003 || Haleakala || NEAT || — || align=right | 1.4 km || 
|-id=696 bgcolor=#fefefe
| 287696 ||  || — || August 22, 2003 || Palomar || NEAT || NYS || align=right data-sort-value="0.96" | 960 m || 
|-id=697 bgcolor=#E9E9E9
| 287697 ||  || — || August 22, 2003 || Socorro || LINEAR || — || align=right | 3.3 km || 
|-id=698 bgcolor=#fefefe
| 287698 ||  || — || August 22, 2003 || Palomar || NEAT || — || align=right data-sort-value="0.79" | 790 m || 
|-id=699 bgcolor=#fefefe
| 287699 ||  || — || August 22, 2003 || Socorro || LINEAR || NYS || align=right data-sort-value="0.95" | 950 m || 
|-id=700 bgcolor=#E9E9E9
| 287700 ||  || — || August 22, 2003 || Haleakala || NEAT || — || align=right | 2.1 km || 
|}

287701–287800 

|-bgcolor=#fefefe
| 287701 ||  || — || August 23, 2003 || Socorro || LINEAR || FLO || align=right data-sort-value="0.79" | 790 m || 
|-id=702 bgcolor=#fefefe
| 287702 ||  || — || August 23, 2003 || Palomar || NEAT || — || align=right data-sort-value="0.98" | 980 m || 
|-id=703 bgcolor=#d6d6d6
| 287703 ||  || — || August 21, 2003 || Palomar || NEAT || — || align=right | 5.9 km || 
|-id=704 bgcolor=#E9E9E9
| 287704 ||  || — || August 22, 2003 || Palomar || NEAT || WIT || align=right | 1.2 km || 
|-id=705 bgcolor=#fefefe
| 287705 ||  || — || August 23, 2003 || Socorro || LINEAR || NYS || align=right data-sort-value="0.81" | 810 m || 
|-id=706 bgcolor=#E9E9E9
| 287706 ||  || — || August 23, 2003 || Socorro || LINEAR || — || align=right | 3.1 km || 
|-id=707 bgcolor=#fefefe
| 287707 ||  || — || August 23, 2003 || Socorro || LINEAR || CHL || align=right | 2.7 km || 
|-id=708 bgcolor=#fefefe
| 287708 ||  || — || August 23, 2003 || Socorro || LINEAR || — || align=right data-sort-value="0.87" | 870 m || 
|-id=709 bgcolor=#E9E9E9
| 287709 ||  || — || August 26, 2003 || Socorro || LINEAR || — || align=right | 1.4 km || 
|-id=710 bgcolor=#E9E9E9
| 287710 ||  || — || August 26, 2003 || Reedy Creek || J. Broughton || — || align=right | 1.6 km || 
|-id=711 bgcolor=#d6d6d6
| 287711 ||  || — || August 26, 2003 || Piszkéstető || K. Sárneczky, B. Sipőcz || — || align=right | 3.0 km || 
|-id=712 bgcolor=#d6d6d6
| 287712 ||  || — || August 24, 2003 || Socorro || LINEAR || TIR || align=right | 3.6 km || 
|-id=713 bgcolor=#d6d6d6
| 287713 ||  || — || August 25, 2003 || Socorro || LINEAR || — || align=right | 4.3 km || 
|-id=714 bgcolor=#d6d6d6
| 287714 ||  || — || August 26, 2003 || Cerro Tololo || M. W. Buie || KOR || align=right | 1.2 km || 
|-id=715 bgcolor=#fefefe
| 287715 ||  || — || August 28, 2003 || Haleakala || NEAT || FLO || align=right data-sort-value="0.72" | 720 m || 
|-id=716 bgcolor=#fefefe
| 287716 ||  || — || August 29, 2003 || Haleakala || NEAT || V || align=right data-sort-value="0.92" | 920 m || 
|-id=717 bgcolor=#fefefe
| 287717 ||  || — || August 29, 2003 || Haleakala || NEAT || CHL || align=right | 2.5 km || 
|-id=718 bgcolor=#fefefe
| 287718 ||  || — || August 30, 2003 || Kitt Peak || Spacewatch || — || align=right data-sort-value="0.75" | 750 m || 
|-id=719 bgcolor=#fefefe
| 287719 ||  || — || August 30, 2003 || Kitt Peak || Spacewatch || — || align=right data-sort-value="0.92" | 920 m || 
|-id=720 bgcolor=#d6d6d6
| 287720 ||  || — || August 31, 2003 || Kitt Peak || Spacewatch || — || align=right | 4.1 km || 
|-id=721 bgcolor=#fefefe
| 287721 ||  || — || August 31, 2003 || Kitt Peak || Spacewatch || NYS || align=right data-sort-value="0.77" | 770 m || 
|-id=722 bgcolor=#E9E9E9
| 287722 ||  || — || August 25, 2003 || Palomar || NEAT || — || align=right | 2.4 km || 
|-id=723 bgcolor=#d6d6d6
| 287723 ||  || — || August 27, 2003 || Palomar || NEAT || URS || align=right | 3.8 km || 
|-id=724 bgcolor=#d6d6d6
| 287724 ||  || — || August 28, 2003 || Palomar || NEAT || — || align=right | 3.5 km || 
|-id=725 bgcolor=#fefefe
| 287725 ||  || — || September 1, 2003 || Socorro || LINEAR || — || align=right | 1.0 km || 
|-id=726 bgcolor=#fefefe
| 287726 ||  || — || September 4, 2003 || Campo Imperatore || CINEOS || H || align=right data-sort-value="0.84" | 840 m || 
|-id=727 bgcolor=#fefefe
| 287727 ||  || — || September 1, 2003 || Socorro || LINEAR || NYS || align=right | 2.6 km || 
|-id=728 bgcolor=#E9E9E9
| 287728 ||  || — || September 13, 2003 || Haleakala || NEAT || — || align=right | 1.1 km || 
|-id=729 bgcolor=#fefefe
| 287729 ||  || — || September 15, 2003 || Palomar || NEAT || FLO || align=right data-sort-value="0.62" | 620 m || 
|-id=730 bgcolor=#E9E9E9
| 287730 ||  || — || September 15, 2003 || Anderson Mesa || LONEOS || — || align=right | 2.2 km || 
|-id=731 bgcolor=#fefefe
| 287731 ||  || — || September 15, 2003 || Anderson Mesa || LONEOS || FLO || align=right data-sort-value="0.77" | 770 m || 
|-id=732 bgcolor=#fefefe
| 287732 ||  || — || September 13, 2003 || Haleakala || NEAT || — || align=right | 1.00 km || 
|-id=733 bgcolor=#E9E9E9
| 287733 ||  || — || September 15, 2003 || Palomar || NEAT || — || align=right | 1.3 km || 
|-id=734 bgcolor=#E9E9E9
| 287734 ||  || — || September 3, 2003 || Socorro || LINEAR || — || align=right | 1.6 km || 
|-id=735 bgcolor=#fefefe
| 287735 ||  || — || September 16, 2003 || Kitt Peak || Spacewatch || — || align=right data-sort-value="0.93" | 930 m || 
|-id=736 bgcolor=#fefefe
| 287736 ||  || — || September 16, 2003 || Kitt Peak || Spacewatch || — || align=right | 1.1 km || 
|-id=737 bgcolor=#fefefe
| 287737 ||  || — || September 16, 2003 || Palomar || NEAT || — || align=right | 1.1 km || 
|-id=738 bgcolor=#fefefe
| 287738 ||  || — || September 16, 2003 || Haleakala || NEAT || V || align=right | 1.1 km || 
|-id=739 bgcolor=#E9E9E9
| 287739 ||  || — || September 16, 2003 || Palomar || NEAT || — || align=right | 1.7 km || 
|-id=740 bgcolor=#E9E9E9
| 287740 ||  || — || September 17, 2003 || Kitt Peak || Spacewatch || — || align=right | 1.1 km || 
|-id=741 bgcolor=#d6d6d6
| 287741 ||  || — || September 16, 2003 || Kitt Peak || Spacewatch || HYG || align=right | 3.3 km || 
|-id=742 bgcolor=#fefefe
| 287742 ||  || — || September 16, 2003 || Palomar || NEAT || NYS || align=right data-sort-value="0.73" | 730 m || 
|-id=743 bgcolor=#d6d6d6
| 287743 ||  || — || September 17, 2003 || Kitt Peak || Spacewatch || — || align=right | 3.9 km || 
|-id=744 bgcolor=#d6d6d6
| 287744 ||  || — || September 17, 2003 || Kitt Peak || Spacewatch || — || align=right | 3.6 km || 
|-id=745 bgcolor=#fefefe
| 287745 ||  || — || September 17, 2003 || Palomar || NEAT || H || align=right | 1.1 km || 
|-id=746 bgcolor=#fefefe
| 287746 ||  || — || September 17, 2003 || Haleakala || NEAT || — || align=right data-sort-value="0.81" | 810 m || 
|-id=747 bgcolor=#fefefe
| 287747 ||  || — || September 18, 2003 || Palomar || NEAT || FLO || align=right data-sort-value="0.65" | 650 m || 
|-id=748 bgcolor=#d6d6d6
| 287748 ||  || — || September 18, 2003 || Kitt Peak || Spacewatch || EOS || align=right | 2.2 km || 
|-id=749 bgcolor=#E9E9E9
| 287749 ||  || — || September 17, 2003 || Palomar || NEAT || — || align=right | 1.4 km || 
|-id=750 bgcolor=#E9E9E9
| 287750 ||  || — || September 18, 2003 || Socorro || LINEAR || — || align=right data-sort-value="0.93" | 930 m || 
|-id=751 bgcolor=#fefefe
| 287751 ||  || — || September 17, 2003 || Haleakala || NEAT || FLO || align=right | 1.0 km || 
|-id=752 bgcolor=#E9E9E9
| 287752 ||  || — || September 16, 2003 || Palomar || NEAT || — || align=right | 1.5 km || 
|-id=753 bgcolor=#d6d6d6
| 287753 ||  || — || September 16, 2003 || Palomar || NEAT || — || align=right | 3.9 km || 
|-id=754 bgcolor=#d6d6d6
| 287754 ||  || — || September 17, 2003 || Palomar || NEAT || — || align=right | 4.1 km || 
|-id=755 bgcolor=#fefefe
| 287755 ||  || — || September 18, 2003 || Palomar || NEAT || H || align=right | 1.1 km || 
|-id=756 bgcolor=#fefefe
| 287756 ||  || — || September 16, 2003 || Anderson Mesa || LONEOS || FLO || align=right data-sort-value="0.72" | 720 m || 
|-id=757 bgcolor=#fefefe
| 287757 ||  || — || September 18, 2003 || Palomar || NEAT || — || align=right | 1.2 km || 
|-id=758 bgcolor=#fefefe
| 287758 ||  || — || September 18, 2003 || Palomar || NEAT || FLO || align=right data-sort-value="0.66" | 660 m || 
|-id=759 bgcolor=#d6d6d6
| 287759 ||  || — || September 16, 2003 || Anderson Mesa || LONEOS || — || align=right | 3.9 km || 
|-id=760 bgcolor=#E9E9E9
| 287760 ||  || — || September 17, 2003 || Kitt Peak || Spacewatch || — || align=right | 2.0 km || 
|-id=761 bgcolor=#fefefe
| 287761 ||  || — || September 17, 2003 || Kitt Peak || Spacewatch || — || align=right data-sort-value="0.87" | 870 m || 
|-id=762 bgcolor=#fefefe
| 287762 ||  || — || September 17, 2003 || Socorro || LINEAR || MAS || align=right | 1.1 km || 
|-id=763 bgcolor=#E9E9E9
| 287763 ||  || — || September 17, 2003 || Campo Imperatore || CINEOS || — || align=right | 2.7 km || 
|-id=764 bgcolor=#fefefe
| 287764 ||  || — || September 18, 2003 || Anderson Mesa || LONEOS || — || align=right data-sort-value="0.88" | 880 m || 
|-id=765 bgcolor=#fefefe
| 287765 ||  || — || September 18, 2003 || Socorro || LINEAR || FLO || align=right data-sort-value="0.87" | 870 m || 
|-id=766 bgcolor=#E9E9E9
| 287766 ||  || — || September 19, 2003 || Socorro || LINEAR || — || align=right | 2.1 km || 
|-id=767 bgcolor=#fefefe
| 287767 ||  || — || September 16, 2003 || Kitt Peak || Spacewatch || NYS || align=right | 1.0 km || 
|-id=768 bgcolor=#fefefe
| 287768 ||  || — || September 17, 2003 || Kitt Peak || Spacewatch || — || align=right data-sort-value="0.82" | 820 m || 
|-id=769 bgcolor=#fefefe
| 287769 ||  || — || September 18, 2003 || Kitt Peak || Spacewatch || FLO || align=right data-sort-value="0.94" | 940 m || 
|-id=770 bgcolor=#E9E9E9
| 287770 ||  || — || September 18, 2003 || Kitt Peak || Spacewatch || KON || align=right | 2.2 km || 
|-id=771 bgcolor=#fefefe
| 287771 ||  || — || September 19, 2003 || Kitt Peak || Spacewatch || — || align=right data-sort-value="0.94" | 940 m || 
|-id=772 bgcolor=#E9E9E9
| 287772 ||  || — || September 17, 2003 || Kitt Peak || Spacewatch || — || align=right | 1.2 km || 
|-id=773 bgcolor=#E9E9E9
| 287773 ||  || — || September 18, 2003 || Kitt Peak || Spacewatch || — || align=right | 1.7 km || 
|-id=774 bgcolor=#d6d6d6
| 287774 ||  || — || September 16, 2003 || Kitt Peak || Spacewatch || — || align=right | 3.7 km || 
|-id=775 bgcolor=#E9E9E9
| 287775 ||  || — || September 18, 2003 || Campo Imperatore || CINEOS || — || align=right | 1.0 km || 
|-id=776 bgcolor=#d6d6d6
| 287776 ||  || — || September 18, 2003 || Palomar || NEAT || EMA || align=right | 4.7 km || 
|-id=777 bgcolor=#E9E9E9
| 287777 ||  || — || September 18, 2003 || Palomar || NEAT || — || align=right | 3.0 km || 
|-id=778 bgcolor=#E9E9E9
| 287778 ||  || — || September 18, 2003 || Kitt Peak || Spacewatch || — || align=right | 2.2 km || 
|-id=779 bgcolor=#d6d6d6
| 287779 ||  || — || September 19, 2003 || Haleakala || NEAT || MEL || align=right | 5.8 km || 
|-id=780 bgcolor=#d6d6d6
| 287780 ||  || — || September 20, 2003 || Socorro || LINEAR || — || align=right | 5.3 km || 
|-id=781 bgcolor=#d6d6d6
| 287781 ||  || — || September 20, 2003 || Socorro || LINEAR || TIR || align=right | 3.9 km || 
|-id=782 bgcolor=#fefefe
| 287782 ||  || — || September 20, 2003 || Kitt Peak || Spacewatch || FLO || align=right data-sort-value="0.87" | 870 m || 
|-id=783 bgcolor=#d6d6d6
| 287783 ||  || — || September 16, 2003 || Kitt Peak || Spacewatch || EOS || align=right | 1.9 km || 
|-id=784 bgcolor=#fefefe
| 287784 ||  || — || September 16, 2003 || Socorro || LINEAR || — || align=right | 1.0 km || 
|-id=785 bgcolor=#fefefe
| 287785 ||  || — || September 16, 2003 || Kitt Peak || Spacewatch || MAS || align=right data-sort-value="0.88" | 880 m || 
|-id=786 bgcolor=#fefefe
| 287786 ||  || — || September 17, 2003 || Anderson Mesa || LONEOS || — || align=right | 1.4 km || 
|-id=787 bgcolor=#E9E9E9
| 287787 Karády ||  ||  || September 20, 2003 || Piszkéstető || K. Sárneczky, B. Sipőcz || — || align=right data-sort-value="0.97" | 970 m || 
|-id=788 bgcolor=#fefefe
| 287788 ||  || — || September 18, 2003 || Socorro || LINEAR || FLO || align=right data-sort-value="0.81" | 810 m || 
|-id=789 bgcolor=#fefefe
| 287789 ||  || — || September 18, 2003 || Palomar || NEAT || ERI || align=right | 1.9 km || 
|-id=790 bgcolor=#fefefe
| 287790 ||  || — || September 21, 2003 || Socorro || LINEAR || — || align=right | 1.2 km || 
|-id=791 bgcolor=#E9E9E9
| 287791 ||  || — || September 19, 2003 || Palomar || NEAT || ADE || align=right | 3.4 km || 
|-id=792 bgcolor=#fefefe
| 287792 ||  || — || September 20, 2003 || Palomar || NEAT || — || align=right | 1.0 km || 
|-id=793 bgcolor=#fefefe
| 287793 ||  || — || September 21, 2003 || Socorro || LINEAR || V || align=right data-sort-value="0.81" | 810 m || 
|-id=794 bgcolor=#fefefe
| 287794 ||  || — || September 20, 2003 || Palomar || NEAT || — || align=right | 1.1 km || 
|-id=795 bgcolor=#E9E9E9
| 287795 ||  || — || September 19, 2003 || Anderson Mesa || LONEOS || — || align=right | 1.5 km || 
|-id=796 bgcolor=#fefefe
| 287796 ||  || — || September 19, 2003 || Anderson Mesa || LONEOS || NYS || align=right | 1.0 km || 
|-id=797 bgcolor=#fefefe
| 287797 ||  || — || September 19, 2003 || Anderson Mesa || LONEOS || — || align=right | 1.1 km || 
|-id=798 bgcolor=#fefefe
| 287798 ||  || — || September 22, 2003 || Kitt Peak || Spacewatch || — || align=right | 1.0 km || 
|-id=799 bgcolor=#fefefe
| 287799 ||  || — || September 18, 2003 || Socorro || LINEAR || — || align=right data-sort-value="0.85" | 850 m || 
|-id=800 bgcolor=#E9E9E9
| 287800 ||  || — || September 18, 2003 || Kitt Peak || Spacewatch || — || align=right | 1.9 km || 
|}

287801–287900 

|-bgcolor=#E9E9E9
| 287801 ||  || — || September 19, 2003 || Kitt Peak || Spacewatch || — || align=right | 1.0 km || 
|-id=802 bgcolor=#d6d6d6
| 287802 ||  || — || September 19, 2003 || Kitt Peak || Spacewatch || — || align=right | 4.8 km || 
|-id=803 bgcolor=#fefefe
| 287803 ||  || — || September 20, 2003 || Palomar || NEAT || V || align=right data-sort-value="0.99" | 990 m || 
|-id=804 bgcolor=#E9E9E9
| 287804 ||  || — || September 21, 2003 || Kitt Peak || Spacewatch || — || align=right | 1.9 km || 
|-id=805 bgcolor=#fefefe
| 287805 ||  || — || September 18, 2003 || Socorro || LINEAR || — || align=right | 1.1 km || 
|-id=806 bgcolor=#fefefe
| 287806 ||  || — || September 18, 2003 || Palomar || NEAT || — || align=right data-sort-value="0.80" | 800 m || 
|-id=807 bgcolor=#fefefe
| 287807 ||  || — || September 18, 2003 || Socorro || LINEAR || — || align=right data-sort-value="0.98" | 980 m || 
|-id=808 bgcolor=#d6d6d6
| 287808 ||  || — || September 18, 2003 || Palomar || NEAT || EOS || align=right | 2.5 km || 
|-id=809 bgcolor=#fefefe
| 287809 ||  || — || September 18, 2003 || Kitt Peak || Spacewatch || — || align=right data-sort-value="0.87" | 870 m || 
|-id=810 bgcolor=#E9E9E9
| 287810 ||  || — || September 18, 2003 || Palomar || NEAT || NEM || align=right | 2.9 km || 
|-id=811 bgcolor=#d6d6d6
| 287811 ||  || — || September 19, 2003 || Kitt Peak || Spacewatch || — || align=right | 3.0 km || 
|-id=812 bgcolor=#d6d6d6
| 287812 ||  || — || September 20, 2003 || Kitt Peak || Spacewatch || CHA || align=right | 4.0 km || 
|-id=813 bgcolor=#E9E9E9
| 287813 ||  || — || September 21, 2003 || Kitt Peak || Spacewatch || — || align=right | 2.7 km || 
|-id=814 bgcolor=#d6d6d6
| 287814 ||  || — || September 21, 2003 || Socorro || LINEAR || 3:2 || align=right | 8.7 km || 
|-id=815 bgcolor=#E9E9E9
| 287815 ||  || — || September 22, 2003 || Anderson Mesa || LONEOS || — || align=right | 3.3 km || 
|-id=816 bgcolor=#d6d6d6
| 287816 ||  || — || September 22, 2003 || Kitt Peak || Spacewatch || — || align=right | 3.9 km || 
|-id=817 bgcolor=#fefefe
| 287817 ||  || — || September 24, 2003 || Palomar || NEAT || — || align=right data-sort-value="0.84" | 840 m || 
|-id=818 bgcolor=#E9E9E9
| 287818 ||  || — || September 24, 2003 || Haleakala || NEAT || — || align=right data-sort-value="0.99" | 990 m || 
|-id=819 bgcolor=#fefefe
| 287819 ||  || — || September 17, 2003 || Kitt Peak || Spacewatch || NYS || align=right data-sort-value="0.70" | 700 m || 
|-id=820 bgcolor=#E9E9E9
| 287820 ||  || — || September 20, 2003 || Palomar || NEAT || — || align=right | 1.4 km || 
|-id=821 bgcolor=#E9E9E9
| 287821 ||  || — || September 20, 2003 || Palomar || NEAT || — || align=right | 3.9 km || 
|-id=822 bgcolor=#E9E9E9
| 287822 ||  || — || September 20, 2003 || Socorro || LINEAR || KON || align=right | 3.1 km || 
|-id=823 bgcolor=#fefefe
| 287823 ||  || — || September 20, 2003 || Kitt Peak || Spacewatch || — || align=right | 1.1 km || 
|-id=824 bgcolor=#fefefe
| 287824 ||  || — || September 20, 2003 || Palomar || NEAT || V || align=right data-sort-value="0.92" | 920 m || 
|-id=825 bgcolor=#E9E9E9
| 287825 ||  || — || September 20, 2003 || Palomar || NEAT || — || align=right | 1.1 km || 
|-id=826 bgcolor=#d6d6d6
| 287826 ||  || — || September 21, 2003 || Anderson Mesa || LONEOS || — || align=right | 4.6 km || 
|-id=827 bgcolor=#fefefe
| 287827 ||  || — || September 21, 2003 || Anderson Mesa || LONEOS || — || align=right data-sort-value="0.96" | 960 m || 
|-id=828 bgcolor=#fefefe
| 287828 ||  || — || September 21, 2003 || Anderson Mesa || LONEOS || — || align=right | 1.2 km || 
|-id=829 bgcolor=#E9E9E9
| 287829 Juancarlos ||  ||  || September 23, 2003 || Sierra Nevada || A. Sota || HEN || align=right | 1.1 km || 
|-id=830 bgcolor=#fefefe
| 287830 ||  || — || September 26, 2003 || Socorro || LINEAR || H || align=right data-sort-value="0.92" | 920 m || 
|-id=831 bgcolor=#fefefe
| 287831 ||  || — || September 26, 2003 || Socorro || LINEAR || H || align=right data-sort-value="0.82" | 820 m || 
|-id=832 bgcolor=#E9E9E9
| 287832 ||  || — || September 22, 2003 || Anderson Mesa || LONEOS || — || align=right | 1.1 km || 
|-id=833 bgcolor=#fefefe
| 287833 ||  || — || September 22, 2003 || Anderson Mesa || LONEOS || NYS || align=right data-sort-value="0.66" | 660 m || 
|-id=834 bgcolor=#fefefe
| 287834 ||  || — || September 22, 2003 || Anderson Mesa || LONEOS || MAS || align=right data-sort-value="0.84" | 840 m || 
|-id=835 bgcolor=#fefefe
| 287835 ||  || — || September 22, 2003 || Socorro || LINEAR || — || align=right data-sort-value="0.98" | 980 m || 
|-id=836 bgcolor=#d6d6d6
| 287836 ||  || — || September 23, 2003 || Palomar || NEAT || HYG || align=right | 3.5 km || 
|-id=837 bgcolor=#fefefe
| 287837 ||  || — || September 25, 2003 || Haleakala || NEAT || FLO || align=right data-sort-value="0.83" | 830 m || 
|-id=838 bgcolor=#E9E9E9
| 287838 ||  || — || September 24, 2003 || Haleakala || NEAT || — || align=right | 3.1 km || 
|-id=839 bgcolor=#d6d6d6
| 287839 ||  || — || September 28, 2003 || Junk Bond || Junk Bond Obs. || — || align=right | 5.6 km || 
|-id=840 bgcolor=#fefefe
| 287840 ||  || — || September 22, 2003 || Anderson Mesa || LONEOS || H || align=right data-sort-value="0.80" | 800 m || 
|-id=841 bgcolor=#E9E9E9
| 287841 ||  || — || September 26, 2003 || Socorro || LINEAR || — || align=right data-sort-value="0.93" | 930 m || 
|-id=842 bgcolor=#d6d6d6
| 287842 ||  || — || September 29, 2003 || Wrightwood || J. W. Young || — || align=right | 4.1 km || 
|-id=843 bgcolor=#d6d6d6
| 287843 ||  || — || September 26, 2003 || Desert Eagle || W. K. Y. Yeung || — || align=right | 2.7 km || 
|-id=844 bgcolor=#fefefe
| 287844 ||  || — || September 27, 2003 || Kitt Peak || Spacewatch || — || align=right data-sort-value="0.93" | 930 m || 
|-id=845 bgcolor=#d6d6d6
| 287845 ||  || — || September 24, 2003 || Palomar || NEAT || EOS || align=right | 4.5 km || 
|-id=846 bgcolor=#fefefe
| 287846 ||  || — || September 24, 2003 || Palomar || NEAT || V || align=right data-sort-value="0.78" | 780 m || 
|-id=847 bgcolor=#fefefe
| 287847 ||  || — || September 25, 2003 || Palomar || NEAT || — || align=right | 1.5 km || 
|-id=848 bgcolor=#fefefe
| 287848 ||  || — || September 26, 2003 || Socorro || LINEAR || — || align=right | 1.1 km || 
|-id=849 bgcolor=#fefefe
| 287849 ||  || — || September 26, 2003 || Socorro || LINEAR || NYS || align=right data-sort-value="0.82" | 820 m || 
|-id=850 bgcolor=#fefefe
| 287850 ||  || — || September 27, 2003 || Kitt Peak || Spacewatch || NYS || align=right data-sort-value="0.86" | 860 m || 
|-id=851 bgcolor=#E9E9E9
| 287851 ||  || — || September 27, 2003 || Kitt Peak || Spacewatch || — || align=right | 1.1 km || 
|-id=852 bgcolor=#E9E9E9
| 287852 ||  || — || September 28, 2003 || Kitt Peak || Spacewatch || MRX || align=right | 1.3 km || 
|-id=853 bgcolor=#fefefe
| 287853 ||  || — || September 26, 2003 || Socorro || LINEAR || — || align=right | 1.2 km || 
|-id=854 bgcolor=#E9E9E9
| 287854 ||  || — || September 26, 2003 || Socorro || LINEAR || — || align=right | 4.0 km || 
|-id=855 bgcolor=#E9E9E9
| 287855 ||  || — || September 26, 2003 || Socorro || LINEAR || — || align=right | 3.9 km || 
|-id=856 bgcolor=#E9E9E9
| 287856 ||  || — || September 27, 2003 || Kitt Peak || Spacewatch || — || align=right data-sort-value="0.91" | 910 m || 
|-id=857 bgcolor=#fefefe
| 287857 ||  || — || September 27, 2003 || Kitt Peak || Spacewatch || V || align=right data-sort-value="0.99" | 990 m || 
|-id=858 bgcolor=#fefefe
| 287858 ||  || — || September 28, 2003 || Kitt Peak || Spacewatch || — || align=right | 1.1 km || 
|-id=859 bgcolor=#d6d6d6
| 287859 ||  || — || September 27, 2003 || Socorro || LINEAR || HYG || align=right | 3.6 km || 
|-id=860 bgcolor=#fefefe
| 287860 ||  || — || September 28, 2003 || Socorro || LINEAR || — || align=right | 1.0 km || 
|-id=861 bgcolor=#d6d6d6
| 287861 ||  || — || September 29, 2003 || Socorro || LINEAR || HYG || align=right | 3.5 km || 
|-id=862 bgcolor=#E9E9E9
| 287862 ||  || — || September 28, 2003 || Kitt Peak || Spacewatch || — || align=right data-sort-value="0.87" | 870 m || 
|-id=863 bgcolor=#E9E9E9
| 287863 ||  || — || September 29, 2003 || Socorro || LINEAR || — || align=right | 2.7 km || 
|-id=864 bgcolor=#E9E9E9
| 287864 ||  || — || September 30, 2003 || Socorro || LINEAR || MAR || align=right | 1.6 km || 
|-id=865 bgcolor=#E9E9E9
| 287865 ||  || — || September 20, 2003 || Socorro || LINEAR || EUN || align=right | 1.3 km || 
|-id=866 bgcolor=#d6d6d6
| 287866 ||  || — || September 28, 2003 || Socorro || LINEAR || CRO || align=right | 4.5 km || 
|-id=867 bgcolor=#E9E9E9
| 287867 ||  || — || September 26, 2003 || Črni Vrh || Črni Vrh || — || align=right | 1.2 km || 
|-id=868 bgcolor=#fefefe
| 287868 ||  || — || September 28, 2003 || Socorro || LINEAR || — || align=right | 1.2 km || 
|-id=869 bgcolor=#fefefe
| 287869 ||  || — || September 29, 2003 || Anderson Mesa || LONEOS || — || align=right | 1.3 km || 
|-id=870 bgcolor=#d6d6d6
| 287870 ||  || — || September 17, 2003 || Palomar || NEAT || — || align=right | 5.3 km || 
|-id=871 bgcolor=#fefefe
| 287871 ||  || — || September 17, 2003 || Palomar || NEAT || V || align=right data-sort-value="0.92" | 920 m || 
|-id=872 bgcolor=#E9E9E9
| 287872 ||  || — || September 17, 2003 || Palomar || NEAT || GEF || align=right | 2.0 km || 
|-id=873 bgcolor=#E9E9E9
| 287873 ||  || — || September 30, 2003 || Socorro || LINEAR || MAR || align=right data-sort-value="0.91" | 910 m || 
|-id=874 bgcolor=#fefefe
| 287874 ||  || — || September 30, 2003 || Socorro || LINEAR || — || align=right data-sort-value="0.81" | 810 m || 
|-id=875 bgcolor=#d6d6d6
| 287875 ||  || — || September 29, 2003 || Andrushivka || Andrushivka Obs. || EOS || align=right | 2.9 km || 
|-id=876 bgcolor=#E9E9E9
| 287876 ||  || — || September 19, 2003 || Palomar || NEAT || HNS || align=right | 2.0 km || 
|-id=877 bgcolor=#d6d6d6
| 287877 ||  || — || September 16, 2003 || Kitt Peak || Spacewatch || HYG || align=right | 3.2 km || 
|-id=878 bgcolor=#d6d6d6
| 287878 ||  || — || September 17, 2003 || Kitt Peak || Spacewatch || — || align=right | 2.2 km || 
|-id=879 bgcolor=#E9E9E9
| 287879 ||  || — || September 28, 2003 || Socorro || LINEAR || — || align=right | 1.7 km || 
|-id=880 bgcolor=#fefefe
| 287880 ||  || — || September 16, 2003 || Kitt Peak || Spacewatch || MAS || align=right data-sort-value="0.70" | 700 m || 
|-id=881 bgcolor=#E9E9E9
| 287881 ||  || — || September 17, 2003 || Kitt Peak || Spacewatch || MAR || align=right data-sort-value="0.96" | 960 m || 
|-id=882 bgcolor=#fefefe
| 287882 ||  || — || September 18, 2003 || Kitt Peak || Spacewatch || — || align=right data-sort-value="0.67" | 670 m || 
|-id=883 bgcolor=#E9E9E9
| 287883 ||  || — || September 18, 2003 || Kitt Peak || Spacewatch || — || align=right | 1.1 km || 
|-id=884 bgcolor=#E9E9E9
| 287884 ||  || — || September 21, 2003 || Kitt Peak || Spacewatch || RAF || align=right | 1.2 km || 
|-id=885 bgcolor=#fefefe
| 287885 ||  || — || September 22, 2003 || Haleakala || NEAT || FLO || align=right data-sort-value="0.90" | 900 m || 
|-id=886 bgcolor=#fefefe
| 287886 ||  || — || September 26, 2003 || Apache Point || SDSS || — || align=right data-sort-value="0.67" | 670 m || 
|-id=887 bgcolor=#d6d6d6
| 287887 ||  || — || September 27, 2003 || Kitt Peak || Spacewatch || — || align=right | 3.8 km || 
|-id=888 bgcolor=#E9E9E9
| 287888 ||  || — || September 26, 2003 || Apache Point || SDSS || — || align=right | 2.2 km || 
|-id=889 bgcolor=#fefefe
| 287889 ||  || — || September 22, 2003 || Kitt Peak || Spacewatch || MAS || align=right data-sort-value="0.96" | 960 m || 
|-id=890 bgcolor=#d6d6d6
| 287890 ||  || — || September 27, 2003 || Apache Point || SDSS || — || align=right | 4.0 km || 
|-id=891 bgcolor=#E9E9E9
| 287891 ||  || — || September 26, 2003 || Apache Point || SDSS || — || align=right data-sort-value="0.90" | 900 m || 
|-id=892 bgcolor=#E9E9E9
| 287892 ||  || — || September 17, 2003 || Kitt Peak || Spacewatch || — || align=right | 2.1 km || 
|-id=893 bgcolor=#fefefe
| 287893 ||  || — || September 18, 2003 || Kitt Peak || Spacewatch || — || align=right | 1.3 km || 
|-id=894 bgcolor=#fefefe
| 287894 ||  || — || September 19, 2003 || Palomar || NEAT || — || align=right data-sort-value="0.94" | 940 m || 
|-id=895 bgcolor=#fefefe
| 287895 ||  || — || September 26, 2003 || Apache Point || SDSS || — || align=right | 1.9 km || 
|-id=896 bgcolor=#fefefe
| 287896 ||  || — || September 26, 2003 || Apache Point || SDSS || MAS || align=right data-sort-value="0.80" | 800 m || 
|-id=897 bgcolor=#d6d6d6
| 287897 ||  || — || September 26, 2003 || Apache Point || SDSS || — || align=right | 3.1 km || 
|-id=898 bgcolor=#d6d6d6
| 287898 ||  || — || September 26, 2003 || Apache Point || SDSS || EOS || align=right | 2.1 km || 
|-id=899 bgcolor=#E9E9E9
| 287899 ||  || — || September 26, 2003 || Apache Point || SDSS || — || align=right | 2.1 km || 
|-id=900 bgcolor=#d6d6d6
| 287900 ||  || — || September 28, 2003 || Apache Point || SDSS || HYG || align=right | 2.5 km || 
|}

287901–288000 

|-bgcolor=#E9E9E9
| 287901 ||  || — || September 28, 2003 || Haleakala || NEAT || EUN || align=right | 1.7 km || 
|-id=902 bgcolor=#d6d6d6
| 287902 ||  || — || September 28, 2003 || Apache Point || SDSS || — || align=right | 3.7 km || 
|-id=903 bgcolor=#E9E9E9
| 287903 ||  || — || September 19, 2003 || Kitt Peak || Spacewatch || — || align=right | 1.1 km || 
|-id=904 bgcolor=#fefefe
| 287904 ||  || — || September 20, 2003 || Anderson Mesa || LONEOS || — || align=right data-sort-value="0.67" | 670 m || 
|-id=905 bgcolor=#d6d6d6
| 287905 ||  || — || September 30, 2003 || Kitt Peak || Spacewatch || — || align=right | 2.5 km || 
|-id=906 bgcolor=#E9E9E9
| 287906 ||  || — || September 30, 2003 || Kitt Peak || Spacewatch || — || align=right | 2.4 km || 
|-id=907 bgcolor=#fefefe
| 287907 ||  || — || October 3, 2003 || Kitt Peak || Spacewatch || — || align=right | 1.5 km || 
|-id=908 bgcolor=#E9E9E9
| 287908 ||  || — || October 14, 2003 || Anderson Mesa || LONEOS || — || align=right | 3.0 km || 
|-id=909 bgcolor=#fefefe
| 287909 ||  || — || October 14, 2003 || Anderson Mesa || LONEOS || V || align=right data-sort-value="0.89" | 890 m || 
|-id=910 bgcolor=#fefefe
| 287910 ||  || — || October 3, 2003 || Kitt Peak || Spacewatch || FLO || align=right data-sort-value="0.83" | 830 m || 
|-id=911 bgcolor=#fefefe
| 287911 ||  || — || October 1, 2003 || Kitt Peak || Spacewatch || FLO || align=right data-sort-value="0.77" | 770 m || 
|-id=912 bgcolor=#fefefe
| 287912 ||  || — || October 1, 2003 || Kitt Peak || Spacewatch || — || align=right | 1.2 km || 
|-id=913 bgcolor=#E9E9E9
| 287913 ||  || — || October 2, 2003 || Kitt Peak || Spacewatch || — || align=right | 2.8 km || 
|-id=914 bgcolor=#E9E9E9
| 287914 ||  || — || October 2, 2003 || Kitt Peak || Spacewatch || — || align=right | 2.3 km || 
|-id=915 bgcolor=#fefefe
| 287915 ||  || — || October 3, 2003 || Kitt Peak || Spacewatch || — || align=right | 1.6 km || 
|-id=916 bgcolor=#fefefe
| 287916 ||  || — || October 3, 2003 || Kitt Peak || Spacewatch || V || align=right data-sort-value="0.65" | 650 m || 
|-id=917 bgcolor=#d6d6d6
| 287917 ||  || — || October 3, 2003 || Kitt Peak || Spacewatch || — || align=right | 3.9 km || 
|-id=918 bgcolor=#E9E9E9
| 287918 ||  || — || October 3, 2003 || Kitt Peak || Spacewatch || — || align=right | 1.8 km || 
|-id=919 bgcolor=#E9E9E9
| 287919 ||  || — || October 5, 2003 || Kitt Peak || Spacewatch || — || align=right | 1.8 km || 
|-id=920 bgcolor=#d6d6d6
| 287920 ||  || — || October 15, 2003 || Palomar || NEAT || HYG || align=right | 2.7 km || 
|-id=921 bgcolor=#fefefe
| 287921 ||  || — || October 16, 2003 || Palomar || NEAT || — || align=right | 1.2 km || 
|-id=922 bgcolor=#fefefe
| 287922 ||  || — || October 18, 2003 || Socorro || LINEAR || H || align=right data-sort-value="0.85" | 850 m || 
|-id=923 bgcolor=#d6d6d6
| 287923 ||  || — || October 18, 2003 || Palomar || NEAT || Tj (2.98) || align=right | 3.8 km || 
|-id=924 bgcolor=#FA8072
| 287924 ||  || — || October 22, 2003 || Socorro || LINEAR || H || align=right data-sort-value="0.91" | 910 m || 
|-id=925 bgcolor=#E9E9E9
| 287925 ||  || — || October 22, 2003 || Kitt Peak || Spacewatch || — || align=right | 1.2 km || 
|-id=926 bgcolor=#E9E9E9
| 287926 ||  || — || October 22, 2003 || Kvistaberg || UDAS || EUN || align=right | 1.6 km || 
|-id=927 bgcolor=#fefefe
| 287927 ||  || — || October 21, 2003 || Palomar || NEAT || H || align=right data-sort-value="0.96" | 960 m || 
|-id=928 bgcolor=#E9E9E9
| 287928 ||  || — || October 16, 2003 || Palomar || NEAT || WIT || align=right | 1.1 km || 
|-id=929 bgcolor=#E9E9E9
| 287929 ||  || — || October 16, 2003 || Kitt Peak || Spacewatch || — || align=right | 2.0 km || 
|-id=930 bgcolor=#E9E9E9
| 287930 ||  || — || October 16, 2003 || Palomar || NEAT || — || align=right | 2.0 km || 
|-id=931 bgcolor=#E9E9E9
| 287931 ||  || — || October 16, 2003 || Kitt Peak || Spacewatch || — || align=right | 3.4 km || 
|-id=932 bgcolor=#fefefe
| 287932 ||  || — || October 17, 2003 || Kitt Peak || Spacewatch || NYS || align=right data-sort-value="0.82" | 820 m || 
|-id=933 bgcolor=#fefefe
| 287933 ||  || — || October 18, 2003 || Kitt Peak || Spacewatch || — || align=right data-sort-value="0.79" | 790 m || 
|-id=934 bgcolor=#d6d6d6
| 287934 ||  || — || October 16, 2003 || Haleakala || NEAT || Tj (2.93) || align=right | 5.5 km || 
|-id=935 bgcolor=#E9E9E9
| 287935 ||  || — || October 18, 2003 || Palomar || NEAT || ADE || align=right | 2.7 km || 
|-id=936 bgcolor=#d6d6d6
| 287936 ||  || — || October 22, 2003 || Kitt Peak || Spacewatch || LIX || align=right | 5.0 km || 
|-id=937 bgcolor=#E9E9E9
| 287937 ||  || — || October 16, 2003 || Kitt Peak || Spacewatch || WIT || align=right | 1.4 km || 
|-id=938 bgcolor=#fefefe
| 287938 ||  || — || October 16, 2003 || Anderson Mesa || LONEOS || FLO || align=right data-sort-value="0.71" | 710 m || 
|-id=939 bgcolor=#d6d6d6
| 287939 ||  || — || October 18, 2003 || Kitt Peak || Spacewatch || — || align=right | 3.1 km || 
|-id=940 bgcolor=#E9E9E9
| 287940 ||  || — || October 18, 2003 || Kitt Peak || Spacewatch || — || align=right | 1.9 km || 
|-id=941 bgcolor=#fefefe
| 287941 ||  || — || October 19, 2003 || Kitt Peak || Spacewatch || — || align=right data-sort-value="0.75" | 750 m || 
|-id=942 bgcolor=#fefefe
| 287942 ||  || — || October 27, 2003 || Socorro || LINEAR || H || align=right data-sort-value="0.76" | 760 m || 
|-id=943 bgcolor=#E9E9E9
| 287943 ||  || — || October 16, 2003 || Palomar || NEAT || — || align=right | 1.9 km || 
|-id=944 bgcolor=#E9E9E9
| 287944 ||  || — || October 18, 2003 || Kitt Peak || Spacewatch || — || align=right | 1.1 km || 
|-id=945 bgcolor=#E9E9E9
| 287945 ||  || — || October 18, 2003 || Kitt Peak || Spacewatch || HOF || align=right | 3.0 km || 
|-id=946 bgcolor=#E9E9E9
| 287946 ||  || — || October 18, 2003 || Palomar || NEAT || — || align=right | 2.9 km || 
|-id=947 bgcolor=#E9E9E9
| 287947 ||  || — || October 20, 2003 || Socorro || LINEAR || — || align=right | 2.1 km || 
|-id=948 bgcolor=#E9E9E9
| 287948 ||  || — || October 20, 2003 || Socorro || LINEAR || — || align=right | 2.2 km || 
|-id=949 bgcolor=#d6d6d6
| 287949 ||  || — || October 20, 2003 || Kitt Peak || Spacewatch || — || align=right | 4.0 km || 
|-id=950 bgcolor=#d6d6d6
| 287950 ||  || — || October 17, 2003 || Anderson Mesa || LONEOS || — || align=right | 5.6 km || 
|-id=951 bgcolor=#fefefe
| 287951 ||  || — || October 18, 2003 || Kitt Peak || Spacewatch || — || align=right data-sort-value="0.71" | 710 m || 
|-id=952 bgcolor=#E9E9E9
| 287952 ||  || — || October 19, 2003 || Kitt Peak || Spacewatch || MAR || align=right | 1.7 km || 
|-id=953 bgcolor=#E9E9E9
| 287953 ||  || — || October 19, 2003 || Anderson Mesa || LONEOS || — || align=right | 1.2 km || 
|-id=954 bgcolor=#E9E9E9
| 287954 ||  || — || October 20, 2003 || Kitt Peak || Spacewatch || — || align=right | 1.7 km || 
|-id=955 bgcolor=#E9E9E9
| 287955 ||  || — || October 20, 2003 || Palomar || NEAT || — || align=right | 3.0 km || 
|-id=956 bgcolor=#fefefe
| 287956 ||  || — || October 18, 2003 || Kitt Peak || Spacewatch || — || align=right | 1.2 km || 
|-id=957 bgcolor=#E9E9E9
| 287957 ||  || — || October 18, 2003 || Palomar || NEAT || — || align=right | 3.9 km || 
|-id=958 bgcolor=#E9E9E9
| 287958 ||  || — || October 19, 2003 || Palomar || NEAT || — || align=right | 2.4 km || 
|-id=959 bgcolor=#fefefe
| 287959 ||  || — || October 19, 2003 || Haleakala || NEAT || MAS || align=right data-sort-value="0.90" | 900 m || 
|-id=960 bgcolor=#E9E9E9
| 287960 ||  || — || October 20, 2003 || Socorro || LINEAR || — || align=right | 1.9 km || 
|-id=961 bgcolor=#E9E9E9
| 287961 ||  || — || October 18, 2003 || Kitt Peak || Spacewatch || GEF || align=right | 1.7 km || 
|-id=962 bgcolor=#fefefe
| 287962 ||  || — || October 18, 2003 || Kitt Peak || Spacewatch || — || align=right | 1.1 km || 
|-id=963 bgcolor=#E9E9E9
| 287963 ||  || — || October 19, 2003 || Palomar || NEAT || — || align=right | 1.4 km || 
|-id=964 bgcolor=#fefefe
| 287964 ||  || — || October 19, 2003 || Kitt Peak || Spacewatch || NYS || align=right data-sort-value="0.65" | 650 m || 
|-id=965 bgcolor=#fefefe
| 287965 ||  || — || October 19, 2003 || Kitt Peak || Spacewatch || — || align=right data-sort-value="0.82" | 820 m || 
|-id=966 bgcolor=#E9E9E9
| 287966 ||  || — || October 20, 2003 || Palomar || NEAT || — || align=right | 2.7 km || 
|-id=967 bgcolor=#fefefe
| 287967 ||  || — || October 18, 2003 || Palomar || NEAT || — || align=right data-sort-value="0.99" | 990 m || 
|-id=968 bgcolor=#E9E9E9
| 287968 ||  || — || October 19, 2003 || Palomar || NEAT || — || align=right | 2.2 km || 
|-id=969 bgcolor=#fefefe
| 287969 ||  || — || October 20, 2003 || Socorro || LINEAR || — || align=right | 1.2 km || 
|-id=970 bgcolor=#E9E9E9
| 287970 ||  || — || October 21, 2003 || Palomar || NEAT || — || align=right | 1.9 km || 
|-id=971 bgcolor=#fefefe
| 287971 ||  || — || October 16, 2003 || Palomar || NEAT || V || align=right data-sort-value="0.97" | 970 m || 
|-id=972 bgcolor=#fefefe
| 287972 ||  || — || October 18, 2003 || Palomar || NEAT || — || align=right | 1.0 km || 
|-id=973 bgcolor=#E9E9E9
| 287973 ||  || — || October 19, 2003 || Anderson Mesa || LONEOS || — || align=right data-sort-value="0.90" | 900 m || 
|-id=974 bgcolor=#E9E9E9
| 287974 ||  || — || October 19, 2003 || Kitt Peak || Spacewatch || — || align=right | 3.9 km || 
|-id=975 bgcolor=#E9E9E9
| 287975 ||  || — || October 20, 2003 || Socorro || LINEAR || — || align=right data-sort-value="0.80" | 800 m || 
|-id=976 bgcolor=#fefefe
| 287976 ||  || — || October 21, 2003 || Palomar || NEAT || NYS || align=right data-sort-value="0.82" | 820 m || 
|-id=977 bgcolor=#fefefe
| 287977 ||  || — || October 20, 2003 || Kitt Peak || Spacewatch || — || align=right | 1.1 km || 
|-id=978 bgcolor=#E9E9E9
| 287978 ||  || — || October 20, 2003 || Kitt Peak || Spacewatch || AGN || align=right | 1.6 km || 
|-id=979 bgcolor=#E9E9E9
| 287979 ||  || — || October 21, 2003 || Kitt Peak || Spacewatch || — || align=right | 2.2 km || 
|-id=980 bgcolor=#fefefe
| 287980 ||  || — || October 21, 2003 || Socorro || LINEAR || — || align=right data-sort-value="0.88" | 880 m || 
|-id=981 bgcolor=#fefefe
| 287981 ||  || — || October 21, 2003 || Socorro || LINEAR || NYS || align=right data-sort-value="0.78" | 780 m || 
|-id=982 bgcolor=#E9E9E9
| 287982 ||  || — || October 21, 2003 || Socorro || LINEAR || BRG || align=right | 2.4 km || 
|-id=983 bgcolor=#fefefe
| 287983 ||  || — || October 21, 2003 || Kitt Peak || Spacewatch || — || align=right | 1.1 km || 
|-id=984 bgcolor=#fefefe
| 287984 ||  || — || October 22, 2003 || Socorro || LINEAR || — || align=right | 1.0 km || 
|-id=985 bgcolor=#fefefe
| 287985 ||  || — || October 22, 2003 || Socorro || LINEAR || FLO || align=right data-sort-value="0.84" | 840 m || 
|-id=986 bgcolor=#E9E9E9
| 287986 ||  || — || October 21, 2003 || Kitt Peak || Spacewatch || — || align=right | 1.8 km || 
|-id=987 bgcolor=#E9E9E9
| 287987 ||  || — || October 21, 2003 || Palomar || NEAT || — || align=right | 2.5 km || 
|-id=988 bgcolor=#E9E9E9
| 287988 ||  || — || October 21, 2003 || Palomar || NEAT || HOF || align=right | 2.7 km || 
|-id=989 bgcolor=#E9E9E9
| 287989 ||  || — || October 21, 2003 || Socorro || LINEAR || — || align=right | 1.4 km || 
|-id=990 bgcolor=#E9E9E9
| 287990 ||  || — || October 21, 2003 || Socorro || LINEAR || MAR || align=right | 1.7 km || 
|-id=991 bgcolor=#fefefe
| 287991 ||  || — || October 21, 2003 || Palomar || NEAT || — || align=right | 1.1 km || 
|-id=992 bgcolor=#d6d6d6
| 287992 ||  || — || October 21, 2003 || Palomar || NEAT || — || align=right | 3.4 km || 
|-id=993 bgcolor=#fefefe
| 287993 ||  || — || October 21, 2003 || Palomar || NEAT || — || align=right data-sort-value="0.74" | 740 m || 
|-id=994 bgcolor=#fefefe
| 287994 ||  || — || October 21, 2003 || Palomar || NEAT || — || align=right data-sort-value="0.82" | 820 m || 
|-id=995 bgcolor=#E9E9E9
| 287995 ||  || — || October 22, 2003 || Socorro || LINEAR || — || align=right | 3.9 km || 
|-id=996 bgcolor=#fefefe
| 287996 ||  || — || October 22, 2003 || Kitt Peak || Spacewatch || NYS || align=right data-sort-value="0.81" | 810 m || 
|-id=997 bgcolor=#E9E9E9
| 287997 ||  || — || October 23, 2003 || Anderson Mesa || LONEOS || — || align=right | 1.1 km || 
|-id=998 bgcolor=#d6d6d6
| 287998 ||  || — || October 23, 2003 || Anderson Mesa || LONEOS || — || align=right | 3.1 km || 
|-id=999 bgcolor=#fefefe
| 287999 ||  || — || October 23, 2003 || Anderson Mesa || LONEOS || — || align=right data-sort-value="0.86" | 860 m || 
|-id=000 bgcolor=#E9E9E9
| 288000 ||  || — || October 23, 2003 || Anderson Mesa || LONEOS || — || align=right | 1.8 km || 
|}

References

External links 
 Discovery Circumstances: Numbered Minor Planets (285001)–(290000) (IAU Minor Planet Center)

0287